= Lists of bodies of water =

Overview of various waterbodies

Lists of bodies of water include:

== Seawater bodies ==
- List of bodies of water by salinity
- List of oceans
- List of seas
  - List of gulfs
- Lists of bays
  - List of gulfs
  - List of bays and coves of Jamaica
  - List of bays in Hong Kong
  - List of bays in the Azores
  - List of bays of Dominica
  - List of bays of South Africa
  - List of bays of the British Isles
  - List of bays of the Philippines
  - List of bays of the United States
    - List of bays of Florida
    - List of bays of Maine
    - List of bays of the Houston area
- Lists of fjords
  - List of fjords in Canada
  - List of fjords, channels, sounds and straits of Chile
  - List of Norwegian fjords
  - List of fjords of Greenland
  - List of fjords of Iceland
  - List of fiords of New Zealand
  - List of fjords of the United States
- List of straits

== Brackish water bodies ==
- List of brackish bodies of water

== Fresh water bodies ==
- Lists of lagoons
- Reservoirs
  - List of reservoirs by surface area
  - List of reservoirs by volume
- Lists of rivers

=== Lakes ===
Lists of lakes

- List of lakes by area
- List of lakes by depth
- List of lakes by volume

==== Lakes, by region ====
- List of lakes and lochs of the United Kingdom
- List of lakes and reservoirs – Mogollon Rim – Mogollon Plateau
- List of lakes of Aust-Agder
- List of lakes of Bavaria
- List of lakes of Bucharest
- List of lakes of Greater Sudbury
- List of lakes of Himachal Pradesh
- List of lakes in Jyväskylä
- List of lakes of Kentucky
- List of lakes of Kosovo
- List of lakes of Schleswig-Holstein
- List of lakes of Tamil Nadu
- List of lakes of Yoho National Park
- List of lakes of the Alpine Lakes Wilderness
- List of lakes of the Lake District
- List of lakes named Diamond
- List of lakes named Fish Lake
- List of lakes named Paw Paw Lake
- List of lakes named Rocky Lake in Nova Scotia
- List of lakes named Summit Lake in British Columbia
- List of lakes named Timber Lake
- List of lakes of Albania
- List of lakes of Argentina
- List of lakes of Australia
  - List of lakes of Western Australia, A–C
  - List of lakes of Western Australia, D–K
  - List of lakes of Western Australia, L–P
  - List of lakes of Western Australia, Q–Z
- List of lakes of Austria
- List of lakes of Azerbaijan
- List of lakes of Belgium
- List of lakes of Bolivia
- List of lakes of Bosnia and Herzegovina
- List of lakes of Brazil
- List of lakes of Bulgaria
- List of lakes of Burkina Faso
- List of lakes of Burundi
- List of lakes of Cambodia
- List of lakes of Canada
  - List of lakes of Alberta
  - List of lakes of British Columbia
  - List of lakes of Manitoba
  - List of lakes of New Brunswick
  - List of lakes of Nova Scotia
  - List of lakes of Nunavut
  - List of lakes of Ontario
  - List of lakes of Quebec
  - List of lakes of Saskatchewan
  - List of lakes of Yukon
- List of lakes of Chad
- List of lakes of Chile
- List of lakes of China
- List of lakes of Croatia
- List of lakes of Denmark
- List of lakes of Egypt
- List of lakes of Estonia
- List of lakes of Ethiopia
- List of lakes of Finland
- List of lakes of France
- List of lakes of Georgia (country)
- List of lakes of Germany
- List of lakes of Greece
- List of lakes of Guatemala
- List of lakes of Hong Kong
- List of lakes of Hungary
- List of lakes of Iceland
- List of lakes of India
- List of lakes of Indonesia
- List of lakes of Israel
- List of lakes of Italy
- List of lakes of Japan
- List of lakes of Kazakhstan
- List of lakes of Kenya
- List of lakes of Korea
- List of lakes of Lithuania
- List of lakes of Malaysia
- List of lakes of Mexico
- List of lakes of Mongolia
- List of lakes of Montenegro
- List of lakes of Nepal
- List of lakes of New Zealand
- List of lakes of Newfoundland and Labrador
- List of lakes of Norway
- List of lakes of Pakistan
- List of lakes of Papua New Guinea
- List of lakes of Peru
- List of lakes of Poland
- List of lakes of Portugal
- List of lakes of Puerto Rico
- List of lakes of Romania
- List of lakes of Russia
- List of lakes of Rwanda
- List of lakes of Serbia
- List of lakes of Slovenia
- List of lakes of South Africa
- List of lakes of South Ossetia
- List of lakes of Sweden
- List of lakes of Switzerland
- List of lakes of Taiwan
- List of lakes of Tanzania
- List of lakes of Turkey
- List of lakes of Turkmenistan
- List of lakes of Uganda
- List of lakes of Uzbekistan
- List of lakes of Vietnam
- List of lakes of Zambia
- List of lakes of the Cook Islands
- List of lakes of the Czech Republic
- List of lakes of the Democratic Republic of the Congo
- List of lakes of the Faroe Islands
- List of lakes of the Kerguelen Islands
- List of lakes of the Netherlands
- List of lakes of the Northwest Territories
- List of lakes of the Palestinian territories
- List of lakes of the Philippines
- List of lakes of the Sawtooth Mountains (Idaho)
- List of lakes of the St. Johns River
- List of lakes of the United Kingdom
  - List of lakes of England
  - List of lakes of Wales
- List of lakes of the United States
  - List of lakes of Alabama
  - List of lakes of Alaska
  - List of lakes of Arizona
  - List of lakes of Arkansas
    - List of lakes of Arkansas County, Arkansas
    - List of lakes of Ashley County, Arkansas
    - List of lakes of Baxter County, Arkansas
    - List of lakes of Benton County, Arkansas
    - List of lakes of Boone County, Arkansas
    - List of lakes of Bradley County, Arkansas
    - List of lakes of Calhoun County, Arkansas
    - List of lakes of Carroll County, Arkansas
    - List of lakes of Chicot County, Arkansas
    - List of lakes of Clark County, Arkansas
    - List of lakes of Clay County, Arkansas
    - List of lakes of Cleburne County, Arkansas
    - List of lakes of Cleveland County, Arkansas
    - List of lakes of Columbia County, Arkansas
    - List of lakes of Conway County, Arkansas
    - List of lakes of Craighead County, Arkansas
    - List of lakes of Crawford County, Arkansas
    - List of lakes of Crittenden County, Arkansas
    - List of lakes of Cross County, Arkansas
    - List of lakes of Dallas County, Arkansas
    - List of lakes of Desha County, Arkansas
    - List of lakes of Drew County, Arkansas
    - List of lakes of Faulkner County, Arkansas
    - List of lakes of Franklin County, Arkansas
    - List of lakes of Fulton County, Arkansas
    - List of lakes of Garland County, Arkansas
    - List of lakes of Grant County, Arkansas
    - List of lakes of Hot Spring County, Arkansas
    - List of lakes of Howard County, Arkansas
    - List of lakes of Independence County, Arkansas
    - List of lakes of Izard County, Arkansas
    - List of lakes of Jackson County, Arkansas
    - List of lakes of Jefferson County, Arkansas
    - List of lakes of Johnson County, Arkansas
    - List of lakes of Lafayette County, Arkansas
    - List of lakes of Lawrence County, Arkansas
    - List of lakes of Lee County, Arkansas
    - List of lakes of Lincoln County, Arkansas
    - List of lakes of Little River County, Arkansas
    - List of lakes of Logan County, Arkansas
    - List of lakes of Lonoke County, Arkansas
    - List of lakes of Madison County, Arkansas
    - List of lakes of Marion County, Arkansas
    - List of lakes of Washington County, Arkansas
  - List of lakes of California
    - List of lakes of Lake County, California
    - List of lakes of the San Francisco Bay Area
  - List of lakes of Colorado
  - List of lakes of Illinois
  - List of lakes of Indiana
  - List of lakes, reservoirs, and dams in Kansas
  - List of lakes of Maine
  - List of lakes of Minnesota
    - List of lakes in Minneapolis
  - List of lakes of Michigan
  - List of lakes of Montana
    - List of lakes of Beaverhead County, Montana
    - List of lakes of Big Horn County, Montana
    - List of lakes of Blaine County, Montana
    - List of lakes of Broadwater County, Montana
    - List of lakes of Carbon County, Montana
    - List of lakes of Carter County, Montana
    - List of lakes of Cascade County, Montana
    - List of lakes of Chouteau County, Montana
    - List of lakes of Custer County, Montana
    - List of lakes of Daniels County, Montana
    - List of lakes of Dawson County, Montana
    - List of lakes of Deer Lodge County, Montana
    - List of lakes of Fallon County, Montana
    - List of lakes of Fergus County, Montana
    - List of lakes of Gallatin County, Montana
    - List of lakes of Garfield County, Montana
    - List of lakes of Golden Valley County, Montana
    - List of lakes of Granite County, Montana
    - List of lakes of Flathead County, Montana (A–L)
    - List of lakes of Flathead County, Montana (M–Z)
    - List of lakes of Glacier County, Montana
    - List of lakes of Greene County, Arkansas
    - List of lakes of Hempstead County, Arkansas
    - List of lakes of Hill County, Montana
    - List of lakes of Jefferson County, Montana
    - List of lakes of Judith Basin County, Montana
    - List of lakes of Lewis and Clark County, Montana
    - List of lakes of Liberty County, Montana
    - List of lakes of Lincoln County, Montana
    - List of lakes of Madison County, Montana
    - List of lakes of Lake County, Montana
    - List of lakes of McCone County, Montana
    - List of lakes of Meagher County, Montana
    - List of lakes of Mineral County, Montana
    - List of lakes of Missoula County, Montana
    - List of lakes of Musselshell County, Montana
    - List of lakes of Park County, Montana
    - List of lakes of Petroleum County, Montana
    - List of lakes of Phillips County, Montana
    - List of lakes of Pondera County, Montana
    - List of lakes of Powder River County, Montana
    - List of lakes of Powell County, Montana
    - List of lakes of Prairie County, Montana
    - List of lakes of Ravalli County, Montana
    - List of lakes of Richland County, Montana
    - List of lakes of Roosevelt County, Montana
    - List of lakes of Rosebud County, Montana
    - List of lakes of Sanders County, Montana
    - List of lakes of Sheridan County, Montana
    - List of lakes of Silver Bow County, Montana
    - List of lakes of Stillwater County, Montana
    - List of lakes of Sweet Grass County, Montana
    - List of lakes of Teton County, Montana
    - List of lakes of Toole County, Montana
    - List of lakes of Treasure County, Montana
    - List of lakes of Valley County, Montana (A–L)
    - List of lakes of Valley County, Montana (M–Z)
    - List of lakes of Wheatland County, Montana
    - List of lakes of Wibaux County, Montana
    - List of lakes of Yellowstone County, Montana
  - List of lakes of Nebraska
  - List of lakes of New Hampshire
  - List of lakes of New York
  - List of lakes of Ohio
  - List of lakes of Oklahoma
  - List of lakes of Oregon
  - List of lakes of Pennsylvania
  - List of lakes of Rhode Island
  - List of lakes of South Carolina
  - List of lakes of South Dakota
  - List of lakes of Texas
  - List of lakes of Utah
  - List of lakes of Virginia
  - List of lakes of Washington
  - List of lakes of West Virginia
  - List of lakes of Wisconsin
    - List of lakes of Marinette County, Wisconsin
    - List of lakes of Oneida County, Wisconsin
    - List of lakes of Vilas County, Wisconsin
  - List of lakes of Wyoming
- List of lakes of the White Cloud Mountains

== Man-made water bodies ==
- Lists of canals
- Lists of reservoirs
  - List of reservoirs by surface area
  - List of reservoirs by volume
  - List of dams and reservoirs in Australia
  - List of dams and reservoirs in Botswana
  - List of dams and reservoirs in Brazil
  - List of dams and reservoirs in Canada
  - List of dams and reservoirs in China
  - List of dams and reservoirs in Cyprus
  - List of dams and reservoirs in the Czech Republic
  - List of dams and reservoirs in Dominican Republic
  - List of dams and reservoirs in Ethiopia
  - List of dams and reservoirs in France
  - List of dams and reservoirs in India
  - List of dams and reservoirs in Iran
  - List of dams and reservoirs in Iraq
  - List of dams and reservoirs in Japan
  - List of dams and reservoirs in Kyrgyzstan
  - List of dams of the LCRV
  - List of dams and reservoirs in New Zealand
  - List of dams and reservoirs in Nigeria
  - List of dams and reservoirs in Pakistan
  - List of dams and reservoirs in Poland
  - List of dams and reservoirs in Portugal
  - List of dams and reservoirs in Romania
  - List of dams and reservoirs in Russia
  - List of dams and reservoirs in Singapore
  - List of dams and reservoirs in Spain
  - List of dams and reservoirs in Sri Lanka
  - List of dams and reservoirs in Switzerland
  - List of dams and reservoirs in Taiwan
  - List of dams and reservoirs in Turkey
  - List of dams and reservoirs in the United Kingdom
  - List of dams and reservoirs in the United States
  - List of dams and reservoirs in Zimbabwe

== See also ==
- List of countries bordering on two or more oceans
- List of rowing venues
- Lists of waterways
