= Spring Creek Reservoir =

Spring Creek Reservoir may refer to:

- Spring Creek Reservoir (California)
- Spring Creek Reservoir (Illinois)
- Spring Creek Reservoir (Cascade County, Montana) in Cascade County, Montana
- Spring Creek Reservoir (Missoula County, Montana) in Missoula County, Montana
- Spring Creek Reservoir (New South Wales)
