= List of lakes of Fergus County, Montana =

There are at least 14 named lakes and reservoirs in Fergus County, Montana.

== Lakes ==
- Crystal Lake, 46°48′01″N 109°30′55″W, el. 6,014 feet (1,833 m)

== Reservoirs ==
- Bear Creek Reservoir, 47°16′21″N 108°40′58″W, el. 3,143 feet (958 m)
- Carters Pond, 47°08′31″N 109°25′44″W, el. 4,022 feet (1,226 m)
- Flat Top Reservoir, 47°37′17″N 108°47′11″W, el. 2,890 feet (880 m)
- Harri Reservoir, 47°25′51″N 108°34′04″W, el. 2,881 feet (878 m)
- Jakes Reservoir, 47°30′28″N 108°37′22″W, el. 3,002 feet (915 m)
- Jordan Reservoir, 47°26′30″N 108°38′05″W, el. 2,923 feet (891 m)
- Kachia Reservoir, 47°23′29″N 108°34′53″W, el. 2,943 feet (897 m)
- Kosier Reservoir, 47°24′17″N 108°38′12″W, el. 2,910 feet (890 m)
- Lincoln Reservoir, 47°22′31″N 108°42′18″W, el. 3,064 feet (934 m)
- Rindal Reservoir, 47°22′00″N 109°01′39″W, el. 3,652 feet (1,113 m)
- Sloan Reservoir, 47°23′26″N 108°42′00″W, el. 3,045 feet (928 m)
- Stafford Reservoir, 47°33′56″N 109°23′36″W, el. 3,241 feet (988 m)
- Upper Carters Pond, 47°09′05″N 109°25′38″W, el. 4,062 feet (1,238 m)

== See also ==
- List of lakes in Montana
