= List of lakes of McCone County, Montana =

There are at least 28 named lakes and reservoirs in McCone County, Montana.

== Lakes ==
- Fort Peck Lake, 48°00′10″N 106°24′58″W, el. 2,313 feet (705 m)
- Hedstrom Lake, 47°13′07″N 106°06′44″W, el. 2,562 feet (781 m)
- Lake Fort Peck, 48°00′00″N 106°25′02″W, el. 2,247 feet (685 m)

== Reservoirs ==
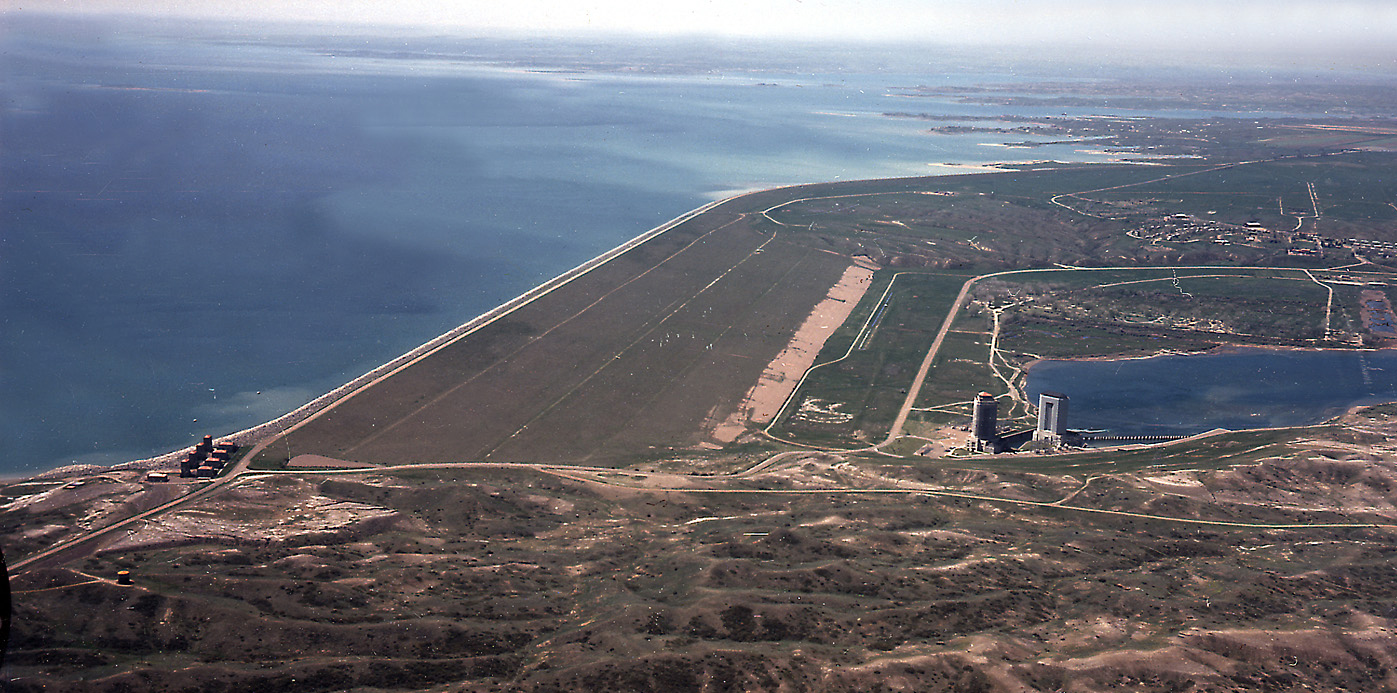
Fort Peck Lake

- Antelope Creek Reservoir, 47°54′28″N 105°41′07″W, el. 2,165 feet (660 m)
- Beery Reservoir, 47°43′41″N 105°23′08″W, el. 2,342 feet (714 m)
- Christianson Reservoir, 47°46′54″N 105°59′56″W, el. 2,372 feet (723 m)
- Dreyer Reservoir, 47°32′18″N 105°56′08″W, el. 2,539 feet (774 m)
- Dreyer Reservoir Number 2, 47°33′12″N 105°57′08″W, el. 2,510 feet (770 m)
- Game Reservoir, 47°49′26″N 106°05′57″W, el. 2,425 feet (739 m)
- Gass Reservoir, 47°45′21″N 105°51′20″W, el. 2,280 feet (690 m)
- Goose Island Reservoir, 47°49′29″N 106°04′02″W, el. 2,362 feet (720 m)
- Groh Stock Reservoir, 47°26′24″N 105°44′20″W, el. 2,539 feet (774 m)
- Haynie Reservoir, 47°34′37″N 105°42′45″W, el. 2,546 feet (776 m)
- Hell Gate Reservoir, 47°47′46″N 106°03′12″W, el. 2,447 feet (746 m)
- Hudiburgh Reservoir, 47°37′54″N 105°32′26″W, el. 2,411 feet (735 m)
- Jays Reservoir, 47°50′02″N 106°05′42″W, el. 2,408 feet (734 m)
- John Ball Reservoir, 47°43′18″N 106°08′20″W, el. 2,375 feet (724 m)
- Leaky Reservoir, 47°29′51″N 106°09′52″W, el. 2,497 feet (761 m)
- Lisk Creek Reservoir, 47°08′30″N 105°51′20″W, el. 2,762 feet (842 m)
- McCloys Reservoir, 47°16′54″N 105°33′38″W, el. 2,753 feet (839 m)
- O'Dell Coulee Reservoir, 47°53′39″N 105°42′02″W, el. 2,188 feet (667 m)
- Quick Reservoir, 47°19′48″N 105°27′38″W, el. 2,818 feet (859 m)
- Quick Reservoir, 47°20′07″N 105°30′57″W, el. 2,615 feet (797 m)
- Switzer Reservoir, 47°36′55″N 105°22′42″W, el. 2,283 feet (696 m)
- Teds Reservoir, 47°49′15″N 106°04′57″W, el. 2,388 feet (728 m)
- Tveten Reservoir, 47°49′53″N 105°43′29″W, el. 2,238 feet (682 m)
- Upper O'Dell Coulee Reservoir, 47°53′58″N 105°42′32″W, el. 2,205 feet (672 m)
- Waters Reservoir, 47°52′31″N 105°15′38″W, el. 2,152 feet (656 m)

== See also ==
- List of lakes in Montana
