= List of lakes of Valley County, Montana (A–L) =

There are at least 266 named lakes and reservoirs in Valley County, Montana.

== Lakes ==
- Abey Reservoir, 48°33′22″N 106°53′30″W, el. 2,562 feet (781 m)
- Baalke Slough, 48°24′25″N 107°02′50″W, el. 2,133 feet (650 m)
- Dry Lake, 48°05′03″N 106°37′09″W, el. 2,287 feet (697 m)
- Georges Pond, 48°46′18″N 106°32′35″W, el. 3,068 feet (935 m)
- Lake Elbert, 48°53′52″N 106°49′13″W, el. 2,615 feet (797 m)
- Lake Grable, 48°50′55″N 106°59′18″W, el. 2,556 feet (779 m)

== Reservoirs ==
- Access Reservoir, 47°59′27″N 106°57′23″W, el. 2,336 feet (712 m)
- Ada Reservoir, 48°33′00″N 106°52′24″W, el. 2,641 feet (805 m)
- Aitken Reservoir, 48°07′08″N 106°43′13″W, el. 2,274 feet (693 m)
- Aldrin Reservoir, 48°05′55″N 106°52′51″W, el. 2,333 feet (711 m)
- Anderson Reservoir, 47°53′13″N 107°22′09″W, el. 2,503 feet (763 m)
- Anna Reservoir, 48°33′05″N 106°51′18″W, el. 2,710 feet (830 m)
- Archambeault Retention Reservoir, 48°00′35″N 106°41′38″W, el. 2,185 feet (666 m)
- Ardis Reservoir, 48°56′50″N 107°09′07″W, el. 2,838 feet (865 m)
- Arrambide Reservoir, 48°02′32″N 107°00′36″W, el. 2,320 feet (710 m)
- B and H Reservoir, 47°48′28″N 106°53′13″W, el. 2,490 feet (760 m)
- Badger Reservoir, 48°07′21″N 106°49′15″W, el. 2,379 feet (725 m)
- Badger Reservoir, 48°06′45″N 107°08′58″W, el. 2,408 feet (734 m)
- Barb Reservoir, 47°54′04″N 106°48′07″W, el. 2,310 feet (700 m)
- Baulk Reservoir, 48°55′17″N 107°09′30″W, el. 2,756 feet (840 m)
- Bean Reservoir, 48°05′35″N 106°54′58″W, el. 2,306 feet (703 m)
- Bear Tracks Reservoir, 48°16′53″N 107°08′48″W, el. 2,543 feet (775 m)
- Beartracks Reservoir, 47°54′13″N 107°22′42″W, el. 2,487 feet (758 m)
- Beast Reservoir, 47°53′12″N 106°53′52″W, el. 2,313 feet (705 m)
- Beaver Reservoir, 48°04′53″N 106°51′16″W, el. 2,320 feet (710 m)
- Beaverhead Reservoir, 47°56′23″N 106°56′24″W, el. 2,395 feet (730 m)
- Becky Reservoir, 48°55′50″N 107°09′04″W, el. 2,739 feet (835 m)
- Beechnut Reservoir, 48°08′08″N 107°06′18″W, el. 2,372 feet (723 m)
- Bend Reservoir, 48°00′38″N 107°08′37″W, el. 2,490 feet (760 m)
- Berger Reservoir, 47°53′13″N 106°40′51″W, el. 2,484 feet (757 m)
- Big Fork Reservoir, 48°03′01″N 106°47′35″W, el. 2,205 feet (672 m)
- Big Rock Detention Reservoir, 48°05′10″N 106°57′38″W, el. 2,260 feet (690 m)
- Bird Reservoir, 48°36′14″N 106°55′35″W, el. 2,425 feet (739 m)
- Black Calf Reservoir, 48°55′45″N 107°06′23″W, el. 2,743 feet (836 m)
- Black Reservoir, 48°35′37″N 106°54′18″W, el. 2,484 feet (757 m)
- Blanchard Reservoir, 48°03′38″N 106°43′48″W, el. 2,215 feet (675 m)
- Bliss Reservoir, 48°00′53″N 106°52′34″W, el. 2,441 feet (744 m)
- Bomber Reservoir, 47°56′38″N 106°48′10″W, el. 2,224 feet (678 m)
- Bones Reservoir, 47°56′16″N 106°58′39″W, el. 2,405 feet (733 m)
- Book Reservoir, 48°37′12″N 106°55′02″W, el. 2,493 feet (760 m)
- Boone Reservoir, 48°00′46″N 106°50′37″W, el. 2,336 feet (712 m)
- Boundary Reservoir, 48°01′41″N 106°55′08″W, el. 2,267 feet (691 m)
- Browning Reservoir, 47°53′47″N 106°51′46″W, el. 2,293 feet (699 m)
- Bubble Reservoir, 47°53′28″N 106°51′42″W, el. 2,313 feet (705 m)
- Bud Reservoir, 48°36′01″N 107°01′12″W, el. 2,543 feet (775 m)
- Bullhead Reservoir, 48°27′52″N 106°21′12″W, el. 2,641 feet (805 m)
- Cabin Reservoir, 48°01′56″N 106°46′22″W, el. 2,172 feet (662 m)
- Cactus Flat Detention Reservoir, 47°59′52″N 106°47′39″W, el. 2,251 feet (686 m)
- Camp Reservoir, 47°52′33″N 107°06′16″W, el. 2,461 feet (750 m)
- Carol Reservoir, 48°51′27″N 107°11′47″W, el. 2,687 feet (819 m)
- Carp Reservoir, 47°56′54″N 106°50′35″W, el. 2,251 feet (686 m)
- Cat Reservoir, 48°01′56″N 106°56′52″W, el. 2,270 feet (690 m)
- Chico Reservoir, 47°51′54″N 106°53′44″W, el. 2,375 feet (724 m)
- Chowder Reservoir, 47°57′16″N 106°49′11″W, el. 2,231 feet (680 m)
- Christmas Reservoir, 48°10′04″N 107°12′36″W, el. 2,461 feet (750 m)
- Cisco Reservoir, 48°07′01″N 106°57′09″W, el. 2,382 feet (726 m)
- Clover Reservoir, 48°01′22″N 107°12′46″W, el. 2,569 feet (783 m)
- Collins Reservoir, 47°53′58″N 106°53′23″W, el. 2,264 feet (690 m)
- Confusion Reservoir, 48°29′32″N 106°54′41″W, el. 2,566 feet (782 m)
- Conrad Reservoir, 48°04′49″N 106°55′44″W, el. 2,293 feet (699 m)
- Cornwell Reservoir, 48°22′28″N 106°42′48″W, el. 2,408 feet (734 m)
- Corral Junction Number 2 Reservoir, 47°53′36″N 106°59′08″W, el. 2,329 feet (710 m)
- Corral Junction Number Two Reservoir, 47°53′39″N 106°59′07″W, el. 2,329 feet (710 m)
- Corral Reservoir, 47°56′39″N 107°18′35″W, el. 2,641 feet (805 m)
- Cottonwood Reservoir, 47°54′13″N 106°55′13″W, el. 2,293 feet (699 m)
- Coulee Reservoir, 48°01′35″N 106°58′14″W, el. 2,267 feet (691 m)
- Craig Reservoir, 48°01′12″N 107°16′09″W, el. 2,595 feet (791 m)
- Crappie Reservoir, 48°03′48″N 106°47′47″W, el. 2,293 feet (699 m)
- Cub Reservoir, 47°58′56″N 106°56′58″W, el. 2,336 feet (712 m)
- Deep Cut Reservoir, 48°04′54″N 106°47′37″W, el. 2,254 feet (687 m)
- Desert Claim Reservoir, 48°41′24″N 106°59′38″W, el. 2,598 feet (792 m)
- Dicks Reservoir, 48°05′54″N 106°50′24″W, el. 2,280 feet (690 m)
- Dime Reservoir, 47°54′35″N 106°46′25″W, el. 2,342 feet (714 m)
- Divide Number Two Reservoir, 47°58′57″N 106°56′55″W, el. 2,333 feet (711 m)
- Divide Reservoir, 47°59′08″N 106°56′57″W, el. 2,346 feet (715 m)
- Do Reservoir, 48°01′37″N 106°50′01″W, el. 2,224 feet (678 m)
- Dodge Reservoir, 48°52′22″N 106°43′32″W, el. 2,703 feet (824 m)
- Dog Creek Reservoir, 47°59′13″N 106°50′07″W, el. 2,267 feet (691 m)
- Don Reservoir, 48°34′18″N 106°55′26″W, el. 2,444 feet (745 m)
- Dont Reservoir, 48°01′37″N 106°48′31″W, el. 2,201 feet (671 m)
- Double Crossing Reservoir, 47°59′13″N 107°03′16″W, el. 2,362 feet (720 m)
- Double Reservoir, 47°52′19″N 106°47′16″W, el. 2,467 feet (752 m)
- Dubbe Reservoir, 48°08′05″N 106°00′29″W, el. 2,251 feet (686 m)
- Duck Creek Reservoir, 47°47′43″N 106°55′22″W, el. 2,379 feet (725 m)
- Duck Creek Reservoir, 47°58′17″N 106°41′03″W, el. 2,270 feet (690 m)
- Duck Soup Reservoir, 47°49′24″N 106°58′32″W, el. 2,598 feet (792 m)
- Duet Reservoir, 48°06′41″N 106°49′09″W, el. 2,431 feet (741 m)
- Eighteen Reservoir, 47°55′36″N 106°52′19″W, el. 2,251 feet (686 m)
- Emory Reservoir, 48°36′39″N 106°54′39″W, el. 2,402 feet (732 m)
- Erie Reservoir, 48°37′25″N 107°04′42″W, el. 2,746 feet (837 m)
- Far-Nuff Reservoir, 48°11′48″N 107°12′12″W, el. 2,451 feet (747 m)
- Finn Reservoir, 47°56′06″N 107°13′00″W, el. 2,638 feet (804 m)
- Five Point Reservoir, 47°54′05″N 106°38′49″W, el. 2,316 feet (706 m)
- Five Reservoir, 47°57′18″N 106°59′40″W, el. 2,533 feet (772 m)
- Flat Drop Reservoir, 47°58′59″N 106°45′14″W, el. 2,182 feet (665 m)
- Florence Reservoir, 48°31′34″N 107°05′49″W, el. 2,405 feet (733 m)
- Forrest Reservoir, 47°53′28″N 106°57′11″W, el. 2,316 feet (706 m)
- Forsman Reservoir, 48°35′41″N 106°42′53″W, el. 2,943 feet (897 m)
- Fort Peck Lake, McCone48°00′10″N 106°24′58″W, el. 2,313 feet (705 m)
- Fort Peck Trout Pond, 48°03′17″N 106°26′30″W, el. 2,044 feet (623 m)
- Four Reservoir, 47°57′08″N 106°57′37″W, el. 2,464 feet (751 m)
- Frazer Lake, 48°03′11″N 106°01′58″W, el. 2,070 feet (630 m)
- Gauge Reservoir, 48°00′01″N 106°46′22″W, el. 2,221 feet (677 m)
- Glen Reservoir, 47°54′55″N 106°43′57″W, el. 2,441 feet (744 m)
- Gordon Reservoir, 48°03′55″N 106°55′22″W, el. 2,264 feet (690 m)
- Grimes Reservoir, 48°57′25″N 107°08′38″W, el. 2,802 feet (854 m)
- Grub Detention Reservoir, 48°02′36″N 106°54′31″W, el. 2,224 feet (678 m)
- Gutshot Detention Reservoir, 47°57′34″N 106°55′50″W, el. 2,277 feet (694 m)
- Half Barrel Reservoir, 47°52′02″N 106°58′35″W, el. 2,392 feet (729 m)
- Half Barrel Reservoir, 47°51′54″N 106°58′32″W, el. 2,388 feet (728 m)
- Halfpint Reservoir, 47°52′33″N 107°07′15″W, el. 2,477 feet (755 m)
- Hamms Reservoir, 48°06′32″N 107°05′12″W, el. 2,333 feet (711 m)
- Hardpan Reservoir, 48°02′00″N 106°54′55″W, el. 2,260 feet (690 m)
- Hen Reservoir, 47°52′42″N 106°56′22″W, el. 2,323 feet (708 m)
- High Moon Reservoir, 47°52′48″N 107°19′39″W, el. 2,589 feet (789 m)
- Horace Reservoir, 48°13′20″N 107°08′35″W, el. 2,529 feet (771 m)
- Horgan Reservoir, 48°12′42″N 106°00′08″W, el. 2,487 feet (758 m)
- Hump Reservoir, 48°06′55″N 106°48′19″W, el. 2,352 feet (717 m)
- Hurricane Reservoir, 48°05′14″N 107°06′13″W, el. 2,362 feet (720 m)
- Itcaina Reservoir, 48°00′33″N 106°58′40″W, el. 2,293 feet (699 m)
- Jack Rabbit Reservoir, 48°02′22″N 106°43′00″W, el. 2,152 feet (656 m)
- Jack Reservoir, 48°36′37″N 106°51′12″W, el. 2,602 feet (793 m)
- Jan Reservoir, 48°03′34″N 106°48′39″W, el. 2,228 feet (679 m)
- January Reservoir, 48°04′49″N 106°45′32″W, el. 2,244 feet (684 m)
- Jim Reservoir, 48°01′33″N 107°03′49″W, el. 2,362 feet (720 m)
- John Reservoir, 47°59′52″N 106°47′39″W, el. 2,251 feet (686 m)
- John Reservoir, 48°01′29″N 107°08′52″W, el. 2,497 feet (761 m)
- Jordan Reservoir, 48°04′18″N 106°54′27″W, el. 2,264 feet (690 m)
- Judy Reservoir, 48°04′54″N 106°49′22″W, el. 2,247 feet (685 m)
- Kaulitski Reservoir, 48°03′18″N 106°58′03″W, el. 2,356 feet (718 m)
- Keeney Reservoir, 48°07′22″N 106°51′42″W, el. 2,329 feet (710 m)
- Kerney Reservoir, 48°07′20″N 106°51′41″W, el. 2,333 feet (711 m)
- Knob Reservoir, 48°03′23″N 106°59′22″W, el. 2,392 feet (729 m)
- Knob Reservoir, 47°52′31″N 106°48′15″W, el. 2,431 feet (741 m)
- Korman Reservoir, 48°03′12″N 107°20′01″W, el. 2,451 feet (747 m)
- Langen Reservoir, 47°59′45″N 106°40′12″W, el. 2,264 feet (690 m)
- Last Chance Reservoir, 48°51′50″N 106°45′37″W, el. 2,602 feet (793 m)
- Last Reservoir, 48°02′27″N 106°45′30″W, el. 2,228 feet (679 m)
- Last Reservoir, 48°00′01″N 106°52′50″W, el. 2,369 feet (722 m)
- Lewis Reservoir, 47°59′04″N 106°40′55″W, el. 2,254 feet (687 m)
- Loblolly Reservoir, 47°55′15″N 107°22′11″W, el. 2,529 feet (771 m)
- Lone Tree Reservoir, 48°01′33″N 106°56′18″W, el. 2,260 feet (690 m)
- Lonely Night Reservoir, 48°06′30″N 106°54′03″W, el. 2,349 feet (716 m)
- Lori Detention Reservoir, 47°54′38″N 106°49′56″W, el. 2,277 feet (694 m)
- Lost McMenomey Reservoir, 47°53′08″N 106°42′34″W, el. 2,461 feet (750 m)
- Lower Lone Tree Reservoir, 47°57′02″N 106°54′15″W, el. 2,283 feet (696 m)
- Lunch Reservoir, 48°07′25″N 106°47′19″W, el. 2,362 feet (720 m)
- Lush Reservoir, 47°56′53″N 106°52′49″W, el. 2,333 feet (711 m)
- Luther Reservoir, 48°16′12″N 107°09′35″W, el. 2,523 feet (769 m)

== See also ==
- List of lakes in Montana
