= Custer County, Montana =

County in Montana, United States

- County
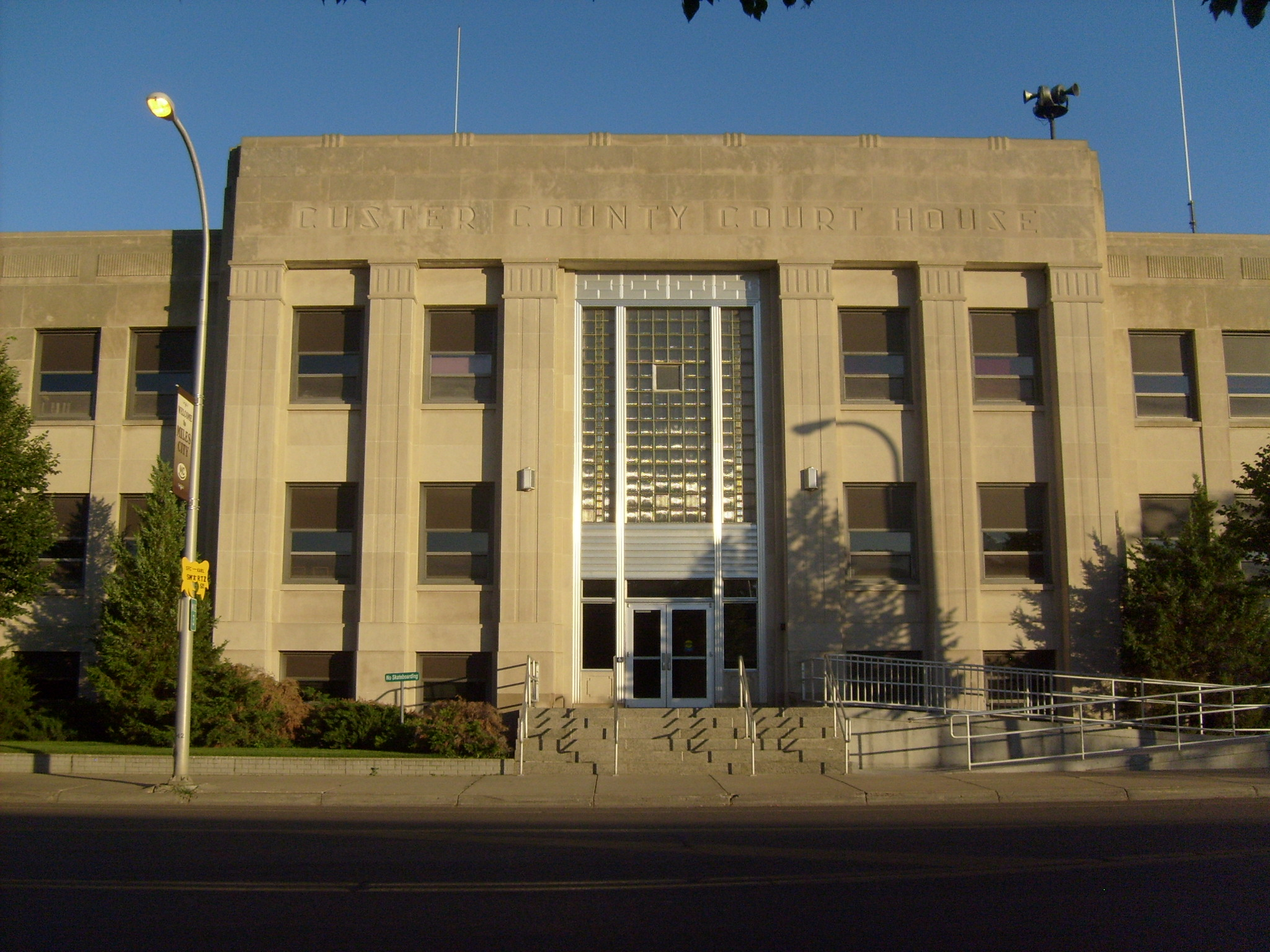
- Custer County Courthouse of Art Deco style architecture of the 1930s era, in the county seat and largest town of Miles City

- Location within the U.S. state of Montana
- Coordinates: 46°16′N 105°35′W
- Country: United States
- State: Montana
- Founded: June 2, 1865
- Named for: George Armstrong Custer (1839–1876)
- Seat: Miles City
- Largest city: Miles City

Area
  - Total: 3,793 sq mi (9,820 km^{2})
  - Land: 3,783 sq mi (9,800 km^{2})
  - Water: 9.9 sq mi (26 km^{2}) 0.3%

Population (2020)
  - Total: 11,867
  - Estimate (2025): 12,034 ▲
  - Density: 3.137/sq mi (1.211/km^{2})
- Time zone: UTC−7 (Mountain)
  - Summer (DST): UTC−6 (MDT)
- Congressional district: 2nd
- Website: custercountymt.gov
- Montana county number 14

Custer County is a county located in the southeast part of the U.S. state of Montana. As of the 2020 U.S. census, the population was 11,867. Its county seat and largest town is Miles City. The county was established after the end of the American Civil War (1861–1865), on June 2, 1865, as one of the nine original counties of the new western federal Territory of Montana, which had been formed the previous May 1864 by the United States Congress, with the approval of 16th President Abraham Lincoln (1809–1865, served 1861–1865). It was originally named Big Horn County of the old Montana Territory, and was renamed on February 16, 1877, in honor of Lieutenant Colonel George Armstrong Custer (1839–1876), commander of the famous 7th Cavalry Regiment of the United States Army, recently massacred and killed in the nearby Battle of the Little Bighorn, in the later portion of the American Indian Wars, the year before in June 1876.

== Geography ==
According to the United States Census Bureau, the county has a total area of 3,793 square miles (9,820 km^{2}), of which 3,783 square miles (9,800 km^{2}) is land and 9.9 square miles (26 km^{2}) (0.3%) is water.

=== Climate ===
According to the Köppen Climate Classification system, Custer County has a mostly cold semi-arid climate, abbreviated "BSk" on climate maps.

Climate data for Mizpah, Montana, 1991—2020 normals, extremes 1960—present
Month	Jan	Feb	Mar	Apr	May	Jun	Jul	Aug	Sep	Oct	Nov	Dec	Year
Record high °F (°C)	69 (21)	73 (23)	85 (29)	92 (33)	101 (38)	111 (44)	112 (44)	110 (43)	106 (41)	96 (36)	80 (27)	70 (21)	112 (44)
Mean maximum °F (°C)	51.6 (10.9)	56.3 (13.5)	71.9 (22.2)	81.3 (27.4)	87.2 (30.7)	95.8 (35.4)	102.5 (39.2)	101.5 (38.6)	97.1 (36.2)	84.2 (29.0)	67.9 (19.9)	54.2 (12.3)	104.4 (40.2)
Mean daily maximum °F (°C)	32.6 (0.3)	36.9 (2.7)	49.7 (9.8)	61.2 (16.2)	70.9 (21.6)	81.1 (27.3)	91.3 (32.9)	90.9 (32.7)	79.4 (26.3)	62.1 (16.7)	46.4 (8.0)	35.2 (1.8)	61.5 (16.4)
Daily mean °F (°C)	19.4 (−7.0)	23.7 (−4.6)	35.4 (1.9)	46.1 (7.8)	55.8 (13.2)	65.6 (18.7)	73.5 (23.1)	72.0 (22.2)	61.0 (16.1)	46.2 (7.9)	32.3 (0.2)	21.9 (−5.6)	46.1 (7.8)
Mean daily minimum °F (°C)	6.3 (−14.3)	10.6 (−11.9)	21.0 (−6.1)	31.0 (−0.6)	40.8 (4.9)	50.1 (10.1)	55.6 (13.1)	53.0 (11.7)	42.6 (5.9)	30.4 (−0.9)	18.3 (−7.6)	8.6 (−13.0)	30.7 (−0.7)
Mean minimum °F (°C)	−23.5 (−30.8)	−15.4 (−26.3)	−4.1 (−20.1)	13.1 (−10.5)	24.3 (−4.3)	36.1 (2.3)	43.2 (6.2)	37.6 (3.1)	25.5 (−3.6)	12.3 (−10.9)	−6.3 (−21.3)	−17.2 (−27.3)	−32.0 (−35.6)
Record low °F (°C)	−45 (−43)	−45 (−43)	−40 (−40)	−5 (−21)	13 (−11)	21 (−6)	33 (1)	31 (−1)	16 (−9)	−11 (−24)	−29 (−34)	−49 (−45)	−49 (−45)
Average precipitation inches (mm)	0.44 (11)	0.48 (12)	0.70 (18)	1.65 (42)	2.92 (74)	2.31 (59)	1.78 (45)	1.02 (26)	1.26 (32)	1.04 (26)	0.50 (13)	0.41 (10)	14.51 (368)
Average snowfall inches (cm)	5.6 (14)	5.0 (13)	5.4 (14)	2.2 (5.6)	0.8 (2.0)	0.0 (0.0)	0.0 (0.0)	0.0 (0.0)	0.1 (0.25)	1.6 (4.1)	3.7 (9.4)	5.5 (14)	29.9 (76.35)
Average precipitation days (≥ 0.01 in)	6.2	6.3	6.3	8.4	10.5	10.4	8.0	5.8	6.3	7.2	5.7	5.9	87.0
Average snowy days (≥ 0.1 in)	4.7	4.4	3.2	1.3	0.3	0.0	0.0	0.0	0.0	1.0	3.2	4.8	22.9
Source 1: NOAA
Source 2: National Weather Service

=== Major highways ===
- Interstate 94
- U.S. Highway 12
- U.S. Highway 212
- Montana Highway 59

=== Transit ===
- Jefferson Lines

=== Adjacent counties ===
- Prairie County – north
- Fallon County – east
- Carter County – southeast
- Powder River County – south
- Rosebud County – west
- Garfield County – northwest

== Demographics ==
Historical population
Census	Pop.	Note	%±
1870	38		—
1880	2,510		6,505.3%
1890	5,308		111.5%
1900	7,891		48.7%
1910	14,123		79.0%
1920	12,194		−13.7%
1930	11,242		−7.8%
1940	10,422		−7.3%
1950	12,661		21.5%
1960	13,227		4.5%
1970	12,174		−8.0%
1980	13,109		7.7%
1990	11,697		−10.8%
2000	11,696		0.0%
2010	11,699		0.0%
2020	11,867		1.4%
2025 (est.)	12,034	▲	1.4%
U.S. Decennial Census; 1790–1960, 1900–1990, 1990–2000, 2010–2020

=== 2020 census ===
As of the 2020 census, the county had a population of 11,867. Of the residents, 22.1% were under the age of 18 and 20.5% were 65 years of age or older; the median age was 41.0 years. For every 100 females there were 101.0 males, and for every 100 females age 18 and over there were 100.0 males. 77.8% of residents lived in urban areas and 22.2% lived in rural areas.

The racial makeup of the county was 91.3% White, 0.6% Black or African American, 1.7% American Indian and Alaska Native, 0.4% Asian, 0.9% from some other race, and 5.0% from two or more races. Hispanic or Latino residents of any race comprised 3.1% of the population.

There were 5,024 households in the county, of which 26.6% had children under the age of 18 living with them and 27.0% had a female householder with no spouse or partner present. About 34.9% of all households were made up of individuals and 14.1% had someone living alone who was 65 years of age or older.

There were 5,776 housing units, of which 13.0% were vacant. Among occupied housing units, 66.8% were owner-occupied and 33.2% were renter-occupied. The homeowner vacancy rate was 1.2% and the rental vacancy rate was 11.7%.

=== 2010 census ===
As of the 2010 census, there were 11,699 people, 5,031 households, and 3,014 families living in the county. The population density was 3.1 inhabitants per square mile (1.2/km^{2}). There were 5,560 housing units at an average density of 1.5 per square mile (0.58/km^{2}). The racial makeup of the county was 95.5% white, 1.7% American Indian, 0.3% black or African American, 0.3% Asian, 0.1% Pacific islander, 0.5% from other races, and 1.6% from two or more races. Those of Hispanic or Latino origin made up 2.2% of the population. In terms of ancestry, 33.6% were German, 18.3% were Irish, 14.3% were American, 14.1% were Norwegian, and 10.6% were English.

Of the 5,031 households, 27.3% had children under the age of 18 living with them, 46.6% were married couples living together, 9.0% had a female householder with no husband present, 40.1% were non-families, and 34.3% of all households were made up of individuals. The average household size was 2.24 and the average family size was 2.88. The median age was 42.1 years.

The median income for a household in the county was $38,913 and the median income for a family was $49,011. Males had a median income of $37,535 versus $26,576 for females. The per capita income for the county was $21,676. About 12.4% of families and 15.7% of the population were below the poverty line, including 19.8% of those under age 18 and 14.6% of those age 65 or over.

== Politics ==
Custer County is a staunchly Republican county, like many others in eastern Montana, increasingly so in recent elections. The last Democrat to carry the county was Lyndon Johnson in 1964.

United States presidential election results for Custer County, Montana
Year	Republican		Democratic		Third party(ies)	
Year	No.	%	No.	%	No.	%
1892	680	52.67%	537	41.60%	74	5.73%
1896	723	51.50%	676	48.15%	5	0.36%
1900	980	66.94%	477	32.58%	7	0.48%
1904	824	72.22%	285	24.98%	32	2.80%
1908	967	60.66%	531	33.31%	96	6.02%
1912	695	21.70%	1,068	33.34%	1,440	44.96%
1916	1,615	37.05%	2,602	59.69%	142	3.26%
1920	2,347	64.53%	1,127	30.99%	163	4.48%
1924	1,654	43.78%	412	10.91%	1,712	45.31%
1928	2,503	64.08%	1,386	35.48%	17	0.44%
1932	1,675	36.99%	2,729	60.27%	124	2.74%
1936	1,381	29.30%	3,196	67.81%	136	2.89%
1940	2,017	41.73%	2,782	57.55%	35	0.72%
1944	1,830	46.96%	2,038	52.30%	29	0.74%
1948	1,845	43.28%	2,359	55.34%	59	1.38%
1952	3,461	62.53%	2,050	37.04%	24	0.43%
1956	3,240	58.30%	2,317	41.70%	0	0.00%
1960	2,943	55.00%	2,393	44.72%	15	0.28%
1964	2,302	45.13%	2,790	54.70%	9	0.18%
1968	2,831	58.06%	1,760	36.10%	285	5.84%
1972	3,486	63.31%	1,875	34.05%	145	2.63%
1976	3,120	55.25%	2,425	42.94%	102	1.81%
1980	3,533	60.75%	1,822	31.33%	461	7.93%
1984	3,879	65.53%	1,982	33.49%	58	0.98%
1988	3,007	55.05%	2,343	42.90%	112	2.05%
1992	2,105	37.52%	1,968	35.07%	1,538	27.41%
1996	2,467	46.29%	2,115	39.69%	747	14.02%
2000	3,156	64.34%	1,501	30.60%	248	5.06%
2004	3,297	65.31%	1,630	32.29%	121	2.40%
2008	3,047	55.89%	2,267	41.58%	138	2.53%
2012	3,373	62.87%	1,833	34.17%	159	2.96%
2016	3,657	70.53%	1,176	22.68%	352	6.79%
2020	4,205	71.76%	1,514	25.84%	141	2.41%
2024	4,208	72.46%	1,385	23.85%	214	3.69%

== Economy ==
Agriculture (dryland farming) and cattle raising provide the bulk of Custer County economy. Miles City serves as the center of commerce in an area extending for 100 miles in every direction. As of 2009 the county's largest employers were Holy Rosary Healthcare, Sanjel USA, Stockman Bank, and Walmart.

== Communities ==
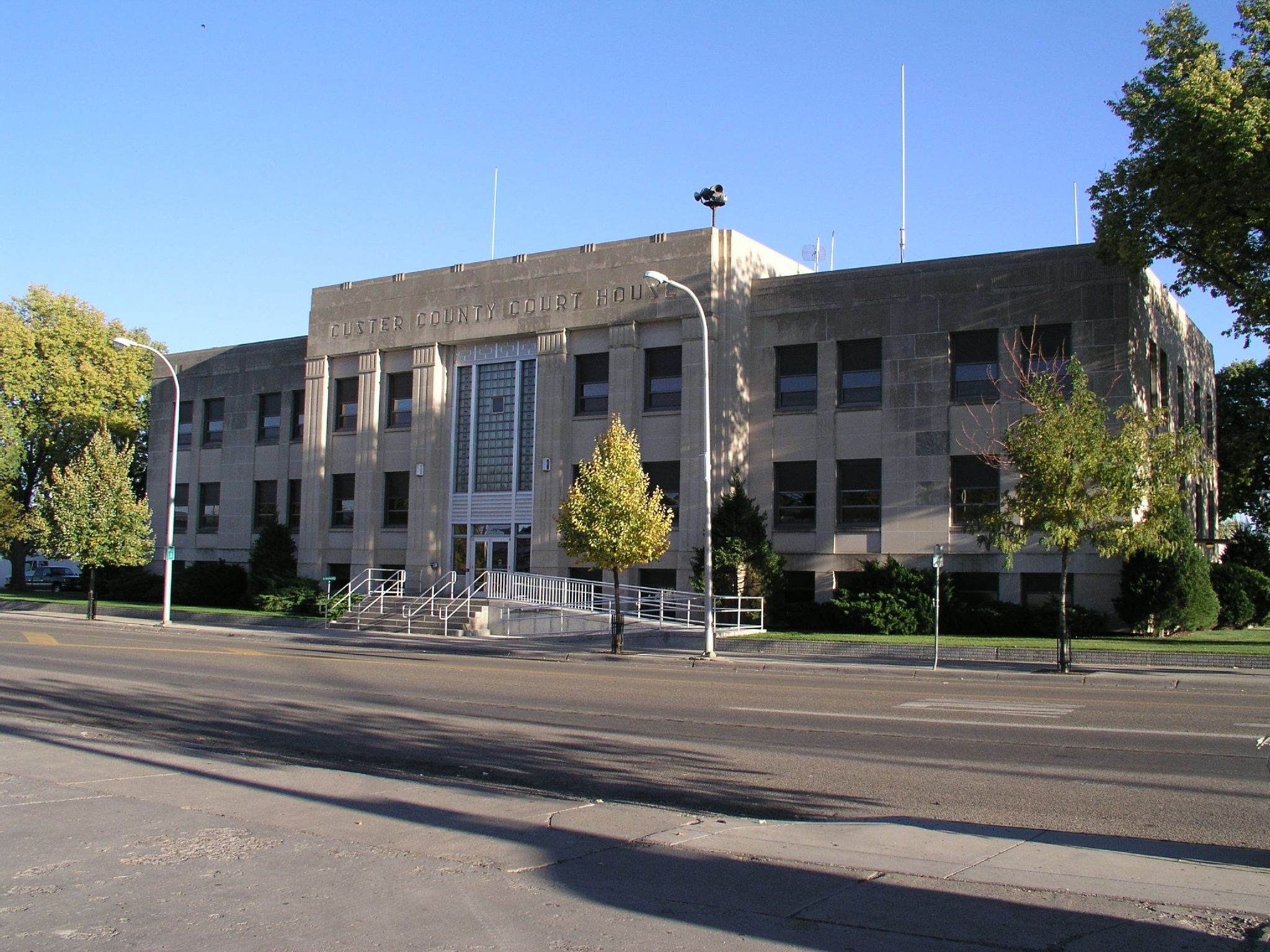
County Courthouse in Miles City

=== City ===
- Miles City (county seat)

=== Town ===
- Ismay

=== Unincorporated communities ===
- Bonfield
- Kinsey
- Knowlton
- Mizpah
- Tusler
- Volborg

== See also ==
- List of lakes in Custer County, Montana
- List of mountains in Custer County, Montana
- National Register of Historic Places listings in Custer County, Montana
