= List of lakes of Powder River County, Montana =

There are at least 143 named lakes and reservoirs in Powder River County, Montana.

== Reservoirs ==
- Anderson Reservoir, 45°17′10″N 105°55′38″W, el. 4,088 feet (1,246 m)
- Anderson Reservoir, 45°30′50″N 106°00′10″W, el. 3,487 feet (1,063 m)
- Antelope Reservoir (Montana), 45°13′15″N 105°56′27″W, el. 3,996 feet (1,218 m)
- Ash Creek Reservoir, 45°20′41″N 106°02′21″W, el. 3,842 feet (1,171 m)
- Ash Creek Reservoir Number Two, 45°21′09″N 106°05′08″W, el. 3,484 feet (1,062 m)
- Basin Reservoir, 45°20′01″N 105°57′45″W, el. 3,829 feet (1,167 m)
- Black Canyon Reservoir (Montana), 45°26′08″N 106°14′01″W, el. 3,996 feet (1,218 m)
- Bloom Creek Reservoir Number One, 45°13′57″N 105°55′44″W, el. 3,989 feet (1,216 m)
- Bloom Creek Reservoir Number Two, 45°13′03″N 105°55′18″W, el. 4,003 feet (1,220 m)
- Boundary Reservoir, 45°10′48″N 106°10′27″W, el. 3,701 feet (1,128 m)
- Boundary Reservoir, 45°32′15″N 105°53′05″W, el. 3,697 feet (1,127 m)
- Bowers Reservoir, 45°25′42″N 105°55′04″W, el. 3,737 feet (1,139 m)
- Buck Pasture Reservoirs, 45°10′27″N 105°57′36″W, el. 3,950 feet (1,200 m)
- Buckberry Reservoir, 45°41′22″N 105°52′27″W, el. 3,484 feet (1,062 m)
- Bull Reservoir, 45°14′57″N 105°49′41″W, el. 3,855 feet (1,175 m)
- Burnside Reservoir, 45°12′07″N 105°56′45″W, el. 3,944 feet (1,202 m)
- CCC Reservoir, 45°13′59″N 105°12′14″W, el. 3,360 feet (1,020 m)
- CCC Reservoir, 45°27′32″N 105°02′39″W, el. 3,350 feet (1,020 m)
- Callaway Reservoir, 45°17′37″N 105°48′18″W, el. 3,766 feet (1,148 m)
- Cameron Reservoir, 45°39′47″N 105°49′07″W, el. 3,494 feet (1,065 m)
- Canyon Reservoir (Montana), 45°20′03″N 105°59′42″W, el. 3,832 feet (1,168 m)
- Chromo Reservoir, 45°26′07″N 106°11′43″W, el. 3,261 feet (994 m)
- Clay Reservoir, 45°12′23″N 105°49′44″W, el. 3,776 feet (1,151 m)
- Cloudburst Reservoir, 45°25′44″N 106°05′58″W, el. 3,281 feet (1,000 m)
- Coal Creek Reservoir, 45°21′40″N 106°11′02″W, el. 3,379 feet (1,030 m)
- Coal Creek Reservoir, 45°42′14″N 105°51′40″W, el. 3,501 feet (1,067 m)
- Coleman Reservoir, 45°32′41″N 106°05′02″W, el. 3,307 feet (1,008 m)
- Cook Creek Reservoir, 45°38′20″N 106°11′37″W, el. 3,422 feet (1,043 m)
- Cottonwood Reservoir, 45°41′15″N 106°09′37″W, el. 3,428 feet (1,045 m)
- Cow Creek Reservoir, 45°18′37″N 106°14′48″W, el. 3,865 feet (1,178 m)
- Crowfoot Reservoir, 45°17′52″N 105°55′58″W, el. 4,091 feet (1,247 m)
- Cub Creek Reservoir, 45°15′05″N 106°16′26″W, el. 3,940 feet (1,200 m)
- Daily Reservoir, 45°36′02″N 106°02′07″W, el. 3,530 feet (1,080 m)
- Daily Reservoir, 45°37′04″N 106°07′37″W, el. 3,405 feet (1,038 m)
- Dam Creek Reservoir, 45°24′19″N 106°06′37″W, el. 3,353 feet (1,022 m)
- Deer Creek Reservoir Number One, 45°41′34″N 106°02′07″W, el. 3,284 feet (1,001 m)
- Deer Creek Reservoir Number Three, 45°39′32″N 106°02′49″W, el. 3,635 feet (1,108 m)
- Deer Creek Reservoir Number Two, 45°39′43″N 106°03′33″W, el. 3,533 feet (1,077 m)
- Detborn Reservoir, 45°33′12″N 106°01′39″W, el. 3,396 feet (1,035 m)
- Diamond Butte Reservoir Number One, 45°14′51″N 105°56′50″W, el. 4,055 feet (1,236 m)
- Diamond Butte Reservoir Number Two, 45°14′17″N 105°55′11″W, el. 3,924 feet (1,196 m)
- Doubtful Reservoir, 45°21′04″N 106°12′25″W, el. 3,681 feet (1,122 m)
- Drop Tube Reservoir, 45°23′33″N 106°10′23″W, el. 3,287 feet (1,002 m)
- Dry Gulch Reservoir, 45°17′59″N 106°05′13″W, el. 3,802 feet (1,159 m)
- Dunning Reservoir, 45°12′51″N 105°52′09″W, el. 3,819 feet (1,164 m)
- Dunning Reservoir, 45°21′53″N 106°10′38″W, el. 3,314 feet (1,010 m)
- Elk Creek Reservoir Number One, 45°22′05″N 105°55′38″W, el. 3,875 feet (1,181 m)
- Elk Creek Reservoir Number Three, 45°22′12″N 106°06′47″W, el. 3,241 feet (988 m)
- Elk Creek Reservoir Number Two, 45°21′51″N 106°05′48″W, el. 3,300 feet (1,000 m)
- Elk Ridge Reservoir, 45°40′44″N 105°49′14″W, el. 3,520 feet (1,070 m)
- Erickson Reservoir, 45°25′54″N 106°02′24″W, el. 3,376 feet (1,029 m)
- Fifteenmile Reservoir Number One, 45°23′30″N 106°05′49″W, el. 3,310 feet (1,010 m)
- Fifteenmile Reservoir Number Two, 45°23′40″N 106°06′29″W, el. 3,317 feet (1,011 m)
- Fletcher Reservoir, 45°12′13″N 106°08′14″W, el. 3,573 feet (1,089 m)
- Fly Creek Reservoir, 45°33′52″N 105°56′15″W, el. 3,750 feet (1,140 m)
- Forsgreen Reservoir, 45°16′57″N 105°24′47″W, el. 3,451 feet (1,052 m)
- Garr Reservoir, 45°20′13″N 105°29′58″W, el. 3,120 feet (950 m)
- Gaskill Reservoir, 45°35′17″N 106°04′26″W, el. 3,340 feet (1,020 m)
- Gaskill Reservoir, 45°35′36″N 106°07′21″W, el. 3,202 feet (976 m)
- Gene Creek Reservoir, 45°27′00″N 106°12′22″W, el. 3,317 feet (1,011 m)
- Goodspeed Draw Reservoir, 45°17′56″N 106°03′13″W, el. 3,796 feet (1,157 m)
- Griffin Pass Reservoir, 45°38′39″N 105°49′31″W, el. 3,550 feet (1,080 m)
- Hailstone Reservoir, 45°13′00″N 105°53′18″W, el. 3,947 feet (1,203 m)
- Halfway Reservoir, 45°17′56″N 105°58′48″W, el. 3,776 feet (1,151 m)
- Hanic Reservoir, 45°34′49″N 106°00′47″W, el. 3,409 feet (1,039 m)
- Happy Coulee Reservoir, 45°09′38″N 106°08′02″W, el. 3,566 feet (1,087 m)
- Hazel Reservoir, 45°13′34″N 105°55′22″W, el. 3,944 feet (1,202 m)
- Hint Reservoirs, 45°31′13″N 105°53′41″W, el. 3,953 feet (1,205 m)
- Hondu Reservoir, 45°20′24″N 105°27′54″W, el. 3,166 feet (965 m)
- Horse Pasture Reservoir, 45°42′06″N 105°59′49″W, el. 3,448 feet (1,051 m)
- Howard Reservoir, 45°23′20″N 106°01′09″W, el. 3,451 feet (1,052 m)
- Howes Reservoir, 45°14′19″N 106°05′45″W, el. 3,796 feet (1,157 m)
- Howes Reservoir, 45°17′48″N 106°02′07″W, el. 3,819 feet (1,164 m)
- Indian Creek Reservoir, 45°13′00″N 106°04′04″W, el. 3,556 feet (1,084 m)
- Indian Creek Reservoir Number One, 45°11′18″N 105°55′58″W, el. 4,062 feet (1,238 m)
- Indian Creek Reservoir Number Two, 45°11′43″N 105°57′36″W, el. 3,963 feet (1,208 m)
- John Gold Reservoir, 45°41′45″N 105°49′27″W, el. 3,484 feet (1,062 m)
- Knudson Reservoir, 45°31′35″N 105°54′09″W, el. 3,789 feet (1,155 m)
- Kueffer Reservoir, 45°13′30″N 105°58′45″W, el. 3,839 feet (1,170 m)
- Last Chance Reservoir, 45°22′36″N 106°12′47″W, el. 3,402 feet (1,037 m)
- Logging Creek Reservoir, 45°33′31″N 105°54′40″W, el. 3,757 feet (1,145 m)
- Lost Creek Reservoir, 45°13′39″N 106°14′29″W, el. 3,862 feet (1,177 m)
- Lower Coal Creek Reservoir, 45°35′02″N 106°09′13″W, el. 3,143 feet (958 m)
- Lower Wilbur Reservoir, 45°35′27″N 105°57′55″W, el. 3,688 feet (1,124 m)
- Lyon Creek Divide Reservoir, 45°18′52″N 105°58′20″W, el. 3,809 feet (1,161 m)
- Main Ash Reservoir, 45°41′10″N 106°07′29″W, el. 3,383 feet (1,031 m)
- Mason Reservoir, 45°15′36″N 105°52′50″W, el. 3,852 feet (1,174 m)
- McLatchy Reservoir, 45°29′55″N 106°02′56″W, el. 3,323 feet (1,013 m)
- Miller Draw Reservoir, 45°10′16″N 106°09′18″W, el. 3,622 feet (1,104 m)
- Moody Reservoir, 45°28′09″N 105°01′15″W, el. 3,225 feet (983 m)
- Morris Reservoir, 45°07′52″N 106°07′55″W, el. 3,678 feet (1,121 m)
- Mud Turtle Reservoir, 45°16′52″N 105°58′15″W, el. 3,957 feet (1,206 m)
- Necessity Reservoir, 45°36′36″N 106°00′42″W, el. 3,570 feet (1,090 m)
- Oil Well Reservoir, 45°38′41″N 105°59′19″W, el. 3,799 feet (1,158 m)
- Paget Reservoir Number Four, 45°22′48″N 106°13′38″W, el. 3,494 feet (1,065 m)
- Paget Reservoir Number One, 45°23′18″N 106°12′18″W, el. 3,445 feet (1,050 m)
- Paget Reservoir Number Three, 45°21′14″N 106°12′40″W, el. 3,678 feet (1,121 m)
- Paget Reservoir Number Two, 45°23′00″N 106°10′02″W, el. 3,238 feet (987 m)
- Phillips Reservoir, 45°32′43″N 105°59′26″W, el. 3,520 feet (1,070 m)
- Pierce Reservoir, 45°17′09″N 105°57′18″W, el. 3,917 feet (1,194 m)
- Plum Creek Reservoir, 45°11′31″N 105°52′06″W, el. 3,727 feet (1,136 m)
- Price Reservoir, 45°20′37″N 106°03′48″W, el. 3,796 feet (1,157 m)
- Rainey Reservoir, 45°13′07″N 105°53′01″W, el. 3,944 feet (1,202 m)
- Reanus Reservoir, 45°11′41″N 106°05′16″W, el. 3,635 feet (1,108 m)
- Ridenour Reservoir, 45°29′51″N 105°53′07″W, el. 3,642 feet (1,110 m)
- Rimrock Reservoir, 45°14′50″N 105°51′48″W, el. 3,858 feet (1,176 m)
- Road Creek Reservoir, 45°39′13″N 105°59′56″W, el. 3,619 feet (1,103 m)
- Road Reservoir, 45°14′20″N 105°59′15″W, el. 3,901 feet (1,189 m)
- Rocky Crossing Reservoir, 45°15′09″N 105°57′36″W, el. 3,966 feet (1,209 m)
- Rocky Draw Reservoir, 45°11′02″N 106°11′35″W, el. 3,753 feet (1,144 m)
- Sanburn Reservoir, 45°09′49″N 105°10′55″W, el. 3,369 feet (1,027 m)
- Sand Rock Reservoir, 45°18′26″N 105°58′26″W, el. 3,776 feet (1,151 m)
- Sartin Draw Reservoir, 45°43′12″N 106°00′20″W, el. 3,392 feet (1,034 m)
- Sawmill Reservoir, 45°43′57″N 106°00′50″W, el. 3,369 feet (1,027 m)
- Schiller Reservoir, 45°41′53″N 106°05′54″W, el. 3,284 feet (1,001 m)
- Seymour Reservoir, 45°14′34″N 106°02′06″W, el. 3,727 feet (1,136 m)
- Shady Rest Reservoir, 45°11′48″N 105°55′33″W, el. 4,022 feet (1,226 m)
- Sheep Creek Reservoir, 45°39′23″N 105°58′11″W, el. 3,858 feet (1,176 m)
- Shell Reservoir, 45°42′15″N 105°49′42″W, el. 3,494 feet (1,065 m)
- Shorty Creek Reservoir, 45°29′39″N 106°06′17″W, el. 3,251 feet (991 m)
- Shorty Ridge Reservoir, 45°27′50″N 106°04′23″W, el. 3,671 feet (1,119 m)
- Shy Reservoir, 45°39′29″N 106°12′05″W, el. 3,396 feet (1,035 m)
- Simon Reservoir, 45°20′56″N 106°13′30″W, el. 3,737 feet (1,139 m)
- Slough Grass Reservoir, 45°15′45″N 105°57′16″W, el. 4,062 feet (1,238 m)
- Smith Reservoir, 45°30′12″N 105°57′54″W, el. 3,606 feet (1,099 m)
- Stewart Reservoir, 45°13′37″N 106°02′31″W, el. 3,694 feet (1,126 m)
- Stewart Reservoir Number Two, 45°15′46″N 106°02′43″W, el. 3,678 feet (1,121 m)
- Straight Creek Reservoir, 45°40′31″N 105°59′11″W, el. 3,533 feet (1,077 m)
- Swope Reservoir, 45°11′53″N 105°49′58″W, el. 3,898 feet (1,188 m)
- Taylor Creek Reservoir Number One, 45°13′35″N 105°57′30″W, el. 3,924 feet (1,196 m)
- Taylor Creek Reservoir Number Two, 45°13′44″N 105°56′51″W, el. 3,963 feet (1,208 m)
- Tobin Reservoir, 45°31′50″N 105°57′42″W, el. 3,684 feet (1,123 m)
- Tooley Creek Reservoir, 45°12′08″N 106°15′07″W, el. 3,835 feet (1,169 m)
- Trout Pond, 45°41′13″N 105°02′57″W, el. 2,923 feet (891 m)
- Turtle Reservoir, 45°17′11″N 105°49′09″W, el. 3,953 feet (1,205 m)
- Two Buck Reservoir, 45°25′45″N 106°04′42″W, el. 3,287 feet (1,002 m)
- Vannett Reservoir, 45°23′38″N 105°04′54″W, el. 3,320 feet (1,010 m)
- Well Reservoir, 45°30′36″N 105°55′49″W, el. 3,940 feet (1,200 m)
- Williams Reservoir, 45°40′09″N 105°51′34″W, el. 3,540 feet (1,080 m)
- Willow Creek Reservoir, 45°35′49″N 106°08′30″W, el. 3,232 feet (985 m)
- Wynkoop Reservoir, 45°12′23″N 105°58′20″W, el. 3,884 feet (1,184 m)
- Wynkoop SU Reservoir, 45°12′26″N 105°59′23″W, el. 3,865 feet (1,178 m)
- Yankee Reservoir, 45°13′22″N 105°54′15″W, el. 3,881 feet (1,183 m)

== See also ==
- List of lakes in Montana
