= List of lakes of Garfield County, Montana =

There are at least 34 named lakes and reservoirs in Garfield County, Montana.

== Reservoirs ==
- Antone Reservoir, 46°54′05″N 106°33′50″W, el. 2,920 feet (890 m)
- Birkrem Reservoir, 46°53′58″N 107°00′10″W, el. 3,212 feet (979 m)
- Buffalo Hill Reservoir, 47°33′48″N 106°42′02″W, el. 2,612 feet (796 m)
- Burgess Reservoir, 47°29′39″N 106°26′03″W, el. 2,425 feet (739 m)
- Cedar Bed Ground Reservoir, 47°24′23″N 106°18′40″W, el. 2,402 feet (732 m)
- Christenson Reservoir, 46°55′33″N 106°31′04″W, el. 2,828 feet (862 m)
- Clear Water Reservoir, 46°51′15″N 106°29′39″W, el. 2,874 feet (876 m)
- Cottonwood Reservoir, 47°27′09″N 106°24′10″W, el. 2,365 feet (721 m)
- Cottonwood Tree Lakes, 46°53′17″N 106°54′32″W, el. 3,133 feet (955 m)
- Ezekial Reservoir, 47°12′27″N 107°50′22″W, el. 2,871 feet (875 m)
- Ezwkial Number One Reservoir, 47°13′01″N 107°53′05″W, el. 2,812 feet (857 m)
- Fisher Reservoir, 47°25′07″N 106°26′54″W, el. 2,464 feet (751 m)
- Fork Reservoir, 47°26′43″N 106°24′38″W, el. 2,415 feet (736 m)
- Fourteen Reservoir, 46°53′04″N 107°00′41″W, el. 3,159 feet (963 m)
- Guesanborn Reservoir, 47°02′30″N 107°08′50″W, el. 2,963 feet (903 m)
- Gumbo Reservoir, 47°26′11″N 106°29′28″W, el. 2,575 feet (785 m)
- Jade Reservoir, 47°31′08″N 106°58′52″W, el. 2,720 feet (830 m)
- Krieder Reservoir, 47°05′42″N 107°28′54″W, el. 3,173 feet (967 m)
- Mashesky Reservoir, 47°10′55″N 107°44′43″W, el. 2,841 feet (866 m)
- McKrone Reservoir, 47°29′39″N 107°01′51″W, el. 2,851 feet (869 m)
- McWilliams Reservoir, 46°57′18″N 106°25′08″W, el. 2,700 feet (820 m)
- Mud Lake, 46°53′06″N 106°57′51″W, el. 3,156 feet (962 m)
- Mullory Reservoir, 47°26′07″N 106°26′36″W, el. 2,480 feet (760 m)
- Murnions Reservoir, 47°20′18″N 106°32′14″W, el. 2,487 feet (758 m)
- Old Lake, 46°53′17″N 106°56′12″W, el. 3,130 feet (950 m)
- Section Four Reservoir, 46°54′45″N 106°32′42″W, el. 2,864 feet (873 m)
- Shaw Reservoir, 46°57′00″N 107°53′24″W, el. 2,625 feet (800 m)
- Split Reservoir, 47°13′06″N 107°45′16″W, el. 2,897 feet (883 m)
- Steel Mule Reservoir, 47°11′34″N 107°37′18″W, el. 3,002 feet (915 m)
- Stroud Reservoir, 47°10′54″N 107°42′53″W, el. 2,913 feet (888 m)
- Ten Reservoir, 46°53′53″N 107°01′44″W, el. 3,232 feet (985 m)
- Thomas Reservoir, 47°25′36″N 106°27′37″W, el. 2,467 feet (752 m)
- Wheatcroft Reservoir, 47°15′00″N 107°19′10″W, el. 2,884 feet (879 m)
- York Reservoir, 47°14′23″N 106°41′24″W, el. 2,684 feet (818 m)

== See also ==
- List of lakes in Montana
