= List of lakes of Judith Basin County, Montana =

There are at least 7 named lakes and reservoirs in Judith Basin County, Montana.

== Lakes ==
- Ackley Lake, 46°57′14″N 109°56′20″W, el. 4,314 feet (1,315 m)
- Hidden Lake, 46°43′21″N 110°27′17″W, el. 6,621 feet (2,018 m)
- Lake Elva, 46°55′35″N 110°31′59″W, el. 7,661 feet (2,335 m)
- Red Shed Lake, 46°59′23″N 110°05′05″W, el. 4,514 feet (1,376 m)
- Rhoda Lake, 46°58′08″N 110°35′48″W, el. 8,258 feet (2,517 m)
- Twin Lakes, 46°58′45″N 110°35′12″W, el. 8,018 feet (2,444 m)

== Reservoirs ==
- Ackley Lake, 46°57′30″N 109°55′57″W, el. 4,321 feet (1,317 m)

== See also ==
- List of lakes in Montana
