= Fort Peck Lake =

Reservoir in Montana

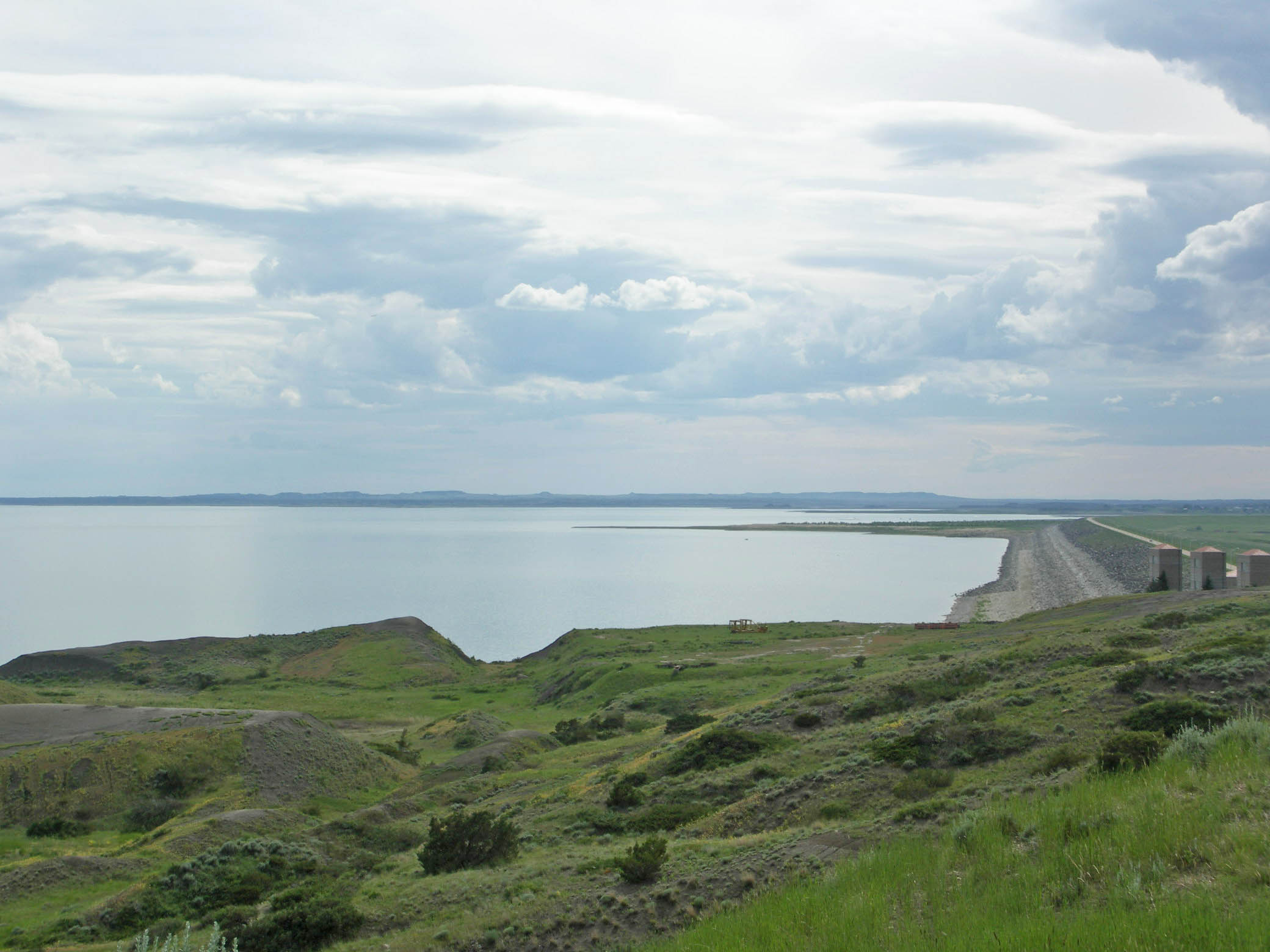
- The lake seen from the Lewis and Clark Overlook east of the dam

- Location within Montana Location within the United States
- Location: Montana, United States
- Coordinates: 47°46′41″N 106°40′53″W
- Lake type: Reservoir
- Primary inflows: Missouri River, Musselshell River, Fourchette Creek, Dry Creek
- Primary outflows: Missouri River
- Catchment area: 57,500 sq mi (149,000 km^{2})
- Max. length: 134 mi (216 km)
- Surface area: 245,000 acres (99,000 ha)
- Average depth: 76.3 ft (23.3 m)
- Max. depth: 220 ft (67 m)
- Water volume: 18,687,731 acre⋅ft (23.050977 km^{3})
- Surface elevation: 2,250 feet (690 m)
- Frozen: Winter
- Islands: York Island, others unnamed
- Settlements: Fort Peck

Fort Peck Lake, or Lake Fort Peck, is a major reservoir in Montana, formed by the Fort Peck Dam on the Missouri River. The lake lies in the eastern prairie region of Montana approximately 140 miles (230 km) east of Great Falls and 120 miles (190 km) north of Billings, reaching into portions of six counties.

The dam and reservoir were built in the 1930s to enhance navigation on the Missouri River, supplying enough water downstream of the dam to provide for a 9-foot deep (2.7 m), 300-foot wide (91 m) navigation channel from Sioux City, Iowa, to the mouth of the Missouri just above St. Louis.

== History ==
Following severe flooding along the Missouri River in 1943, which hampered the economic development of the Missouri River Valley and damaged production of military supplies for then-ongoing World War II, five additional dams were added when the federal government adopted the Pick-Sloan Plan, calling for a series of dams and reservoirs to be built along the Missouri and its tributaries. Fort Peck Dam was built from 1933 to 1940 by the U.S. Army Corps of Engineers; water impoundment began in 1937 and the reservoir was first filled to capacity in 1947. The federal government forced out ranchers and farmers who lived in the valley bottom to prepare room for the lake.

== Description ==
With a volume of 18,700,000 acre-feet (23.1 km^{3}) when full, Fort Peck is the fifth largest artificial lake in the United States. It extends 134 miles (216 km) through central Montana, and its twisting, inlet-studded shoreline has a total length of some 1,520 miles (2,450 km). Along with the Missouri River, smaller tributaries such as the Musselshell River, Fourchette Creek, Timber Creek, Hell Creek and Dry Creek feed the reservoir; the latter forms the longest side arm of the reservoir, which reaches some 30 miles (48 km) southwards. The lake covers an area of 245,000 acres (99,000 ha), making it the largest in Montana by surface area, although Flathead Lake has a larger volume due to its greater depth.

The reservoir is also a tourist attraction, with 27 designated recreational sites bordering its shores. Bordering nearly the entire reservoir is the 1,719-square-mile (4,450 km^{2}) Charles M. Russell National Wildlife Refuge, which has preserved much of the high prairie and hill country around the lake.

The lake is featured in the film Jurassic Park III, as part of an excavation.

== Fishing ==
Fishing is popular at the reservoir and a large variety of fish have been introduced into the lake.

Species
Species	Family	Class	Native to MT
Bigmouth Buffalo	Sucker	Warmwater	Native
Black Bullhead	Catfish	Warmwater	Introduced
Black Crappie	Sunfish	Warmwater	Introduced
Blue Sucker	Sucker	Warmwater	Native
Bluegill	Sunfish	Warmwater	Introduced
Brassy Minnow	Minnow	Warmwater	Native
Brook Stickleback	Stickleback	Warmwater	Native
Brown Trout	Trout	Coldwater	Introduced
Burbot	Codfish	Coldwater	Native
Channel Catfish	Catfish	Warmwater	Native
Chinook Salmon	Trout		Introduced
Cisco	Trout	Warmwater	Introduced
Common Carp	Minnow	Warmwater	Introduced
Creek Chub	Minnow	Warmwater	Native
Emerald Shiner	Minnow	Warmwater	Native
Fathead Minnow	Minnow	Warmwater	Native
Flathead Chub	Minnow	Warmwater	Native
Freshwater Drum	Drum	Warmwater	Native
Goldeye	Mooneye	Warmwater	Native
Green Sunfish	Sunfish	Warmwater	Introduced
Iowa Darter	Perch	Warmwater	Native
Lake Chub	Minnow	Warmwater	Native
Lake Trout	Trout	Coldwater	Native
Lake Whitefish	Trout	Coldwater	Introduced
Largemouth Bass	Sunfish	Warmwater	Introduced
Longnose Dace	Minnow	Warmwater	Native
Longnose Sucker	Sucker	Warmwater	Native
Northern Pike	Pike	Warmwater	Introduced
Northern Redbelly Dace	Minnow	Warmwater	Native
Paddlefish	Paddlefish	Warmwater	Native
Pallid Sturgeon	Sturgeon	Warmwater	Native
Plains Killifish	Killifish		Introduced
Plains Minnow	Minnow	Warmwater	Native
Rainbow Trout	Trout	Coldwater	Introduced
River Carpsucker	Sucker	Warmwater	Native
Sand Shiner	Minnow	Warmwater	Native
Sauger	Perch	Warmwater	Native
Shorthead Redhorse	Sucker	Warmwater	Native
Shovelnose Sturgeon	Sturgeon	Warmwater	Native
Smallmouth Bass	Sunfish	Warmwater	Introduced
Smallmouth Buffalo	Sucker	Warmwater	Native
Spottail Shiner	Minnow	Warmwater	Introduced
Stonecat	Catfish		Native
Walleye	Perch	Warmwater	Introduced
White Crappie	Sunfish	Warmwater	Introduced
White Sucker	Sucker	Warmwater	Native
Yellow Perch	Perch	Warmwater	Introduced

== See also ==
- New Deal
- Public Works Administration
- List of lakes in Montana
- List of largest reservoirs in the United States
- List of reservoirs by volume
