= List of lakes of Roosevelt County, Montana =

There are at least 14 named lakes and reservoirs in Roosevelt County, Montana.

== Lakes ==
- Duck Lake, 48°20′40″N 104°20′57″W, el. 2,169 feet (661 m)
- Geddart Lake, 48°19′52″N 105°02′31″W, el. 2,149 feet (655 m)
- Horseshoe Lake, 48°17′45″N 105°14′00″W, el. 2,379 feet (725 m)
- Johnson Lake, 48°20′09″N 104°34′23″W, el. 1,929 feet (588 m)
- Manning Lake, 48°15′35″N 104°44′10″W, el. 1,916 feet (584 m)
- McIlwain Lake, 48°14′28″N 104°55′31″W, el. 2,014 feet (614 m)

== Reservoirs ==
- Bertino Reservoir, 48°12′39″N 104°45′04″W, el. 2,028 feet (618 m)
- Crandall Reservoir, 48°13′51″N 105°13′03″W, el. 2,175 feet (663 m)
- Harmon Reservoir, 48°05′30″N 104°15′26″W, el. 1,991 feet (607 m)
- Homestead Lake, 48°22′11″N 104°35′04″W, el. 1,929 feet (588 m)
- Picard Reservoir, 48°18′12″N 104°07′14″W, el. 2,257 feet (688 m)
- Shotgun Reservoir, 48°10′45″N 104°14′04″W, el. 2,011 feet (613 m)
- Structure Number 139 Reservoir, 48°13′54″N 105°13′08″W, el. 2,175 feet (663 m)
- Structure Number 149 Reservoir, 48°16′18″N 105°23′14″W, el. 2,431 feet (741 m)

== See also ==
- List of lakes in Montana
