= List of lakes of Wheatland County, Montana =

There are at least 10 named lakes and reservoirs in Wheatland County, Montana.

== Lakes ==
- Elk Lake, 46°14′14″N 110°15′52″W, el. 6,863 feet (2,092 m)

== Reservoirs ==
- Deadmans Basin Reservoir, 46°20′21″N 109°24′42″W, el. 3,894 feet (1,187 m)
- Fox Reservoir, 46°23′11″N 110°04′30″W, el. 4,626 feet (1,410 m)
- Jellison Reservoir, 46°39′42″N 110°03′43″W, el. 5,623 feet (1,714 m)
- Lebo Lake, 46°19′14″N 110°01′57″W, el. 4,924 feet (1,501 m)
- Lode Reservoir, 46°33′15″N 109°51′11″W, el. 4,550 feet (1,390 m)
- Martin and C Bar J Reservoir, 46°19′05″N 110°08′16″W, el. 5,223 feet (1,592 m)
- Martinsdale Reservoir, 46°27′07″N 110°16′04″W, el. 4,783 feet (1,458 m)
- Middle Fork Reservoir, 46°39′13″N 110°05′14″W, el. 5,659 feet (1,725 m)
- Nelson Reservoir, 46°33′41″N 109°58′14″W, el. 4,774 feet (1,455 m)

== See also ==
- List of lakes in Montana
