= List of lakes of Wibaux County, Montana =

There is at least one named lake and reservoir in Wibaux County, Montana.

== Reservoirs ==
- Lamesteer Reservoir, 46°48′00″N 104°09′26″W, el. 2,926 feet (892 m)

== See also ==
- List of lakes in Montana
