= List of lakes of Liberty County, Montana =

There are at least 19 named lakes and reservoirs in Liberty County, Montana.

== Lakes ==
- Bingham Lake, 48°58′37″N 111°06′57″W, el. 3,747 feet (1,142 m)
- Chicago Lake, 48°51′58″N 111°15′49″W, el. 4,163 feet (1,269 m)
- Lees Lake, 48°08′56″N 110°46′31″W, el. 3,130 feet (950 m)

== Reservoirs ==
- Blair Reservoir, 48°42′36″N 110°12′57″W, el. 2,785 feet (849 m)
- Bourne and Hamilton Reservoir, 48°27′36″N 111°11′39″W, el. 3,192 feet (973 m)
- Bourpe and Hamilton Reservoir, 48°43′00″N 111°10′33″W, el. 3,697 feet (1,127 m)
- Brown Reservoir, 48°56′48″N 111°16′03″W, el. 3,714 feet (1,132 m)
- Browns Reservoir, 48°26′47″N 111°06′50″W, el. 3,195 feet (974 m)
- Gagnon Reservoir, 48°22′52″N 110°59′12″W, el. 2,992 feet (912 m)
- Great Northern Reservoir, 48°31′06″N 110°57′37″W, el. 3,143 feet (958 m)
- Hollandsworth Reservoir, 48°11′06″N 111°21′21″W, el. 3,189 feet (972 m)
- Lake Elwell, 48°19′20″N 111°05′48″W, el. 3,025 feet (922 m)
- Potts Reservoir, 48°29′10″N 111°00′11″W, el. 3,143 feet (958 m)
- Pugsley Reservoir, 48°15′31″N 111°01′27″W, el. 2,838 feet (865 m)
- Romain Reservoir, 48°09′00″N 110°51′15″W, el. 3,113 feet (949 m)
- Tempel Reservoir, 48°49′00″N 110°51′33″W, el. 3,323 feet (1,013 m)
- Turner Reservoir, 48°57′18″N 110°56′57″W, el. 3,327 feet (1,014 m)
- Vaver Reservoir, 48°51′54″N 110°55′23″W, el. 3,474 feet (1,059 m)
- Walden Reservoir, 48°29′30″N 111°00′56″W, el. 3,169 feet (966 m)

== See also ==
- List of lakes in Montana
