= List of lakes of Carter County, Montana =

There are at least 52 named lakes and reservoirs in Carter County, Montana.

== Lakes ==
- Soda Lakes, 45°43′38″N 104°30′24″W, el. 3,278 feet (999 m)

== Reservoirs ==
- Abel Reservoir, 45°43′31″N 104°11′20″W, el. 3,510 feet (1,070 m)
- Apache Reservoir, 45°40′27″N 104°36′17″W, el. 3,369 feet (1,027 m)
- Bar C Reservoir, 45°47′40″N 104°13′13″W, el. 3,287 feet (1,002 m)
- Blackfoot Reservoir, 45°41′04″N 104°31′51″W, el. 3,251 feet (991 m)
- Brewer Reservoir, 45°36′28″N 104°14′02″W, el. 3,839 feet (1,170 m)
- Bucholtz Reservoir, 45°35′09″N 104°03′39″W, el. 3,399 feet (1,036 m)
- Burditt Reservoir, 45°39′51″N 104°16′08″W, el. 3,422 feet (1,043 m)
- Cherokee Reservoir, 45°40′13″N 104°31′53″W, el. 3,281 feet (1,000 m)
- Cheyenne Reservoir, 45°41′22″N 104°34′00″W, el. 3,304 feet (1,007 m)
- Cochran Reservoir, 45°05′45″N 104°41′37″W, el. 3,550 feet (1,080 m)
- Dead Horse Reservoir, 45°40′31″N 104°14′40″W, el. 3,697 feet (1,127 m)
- Devils Canyon Reservoir, 45°41′35″N 104°15′55″W, el. 3,376 feet (1,029 m)
- Dewdrop Reservoir, 45°36′49″N 104°16′12″W, el. 3,622 feet (1,104 m)
- Dugout Reservoir, 45°55′01″N 104°49′09″W, el. 3,291 feet (1,003 m)
- E-B Reservoir, 45°40′30″N 104°16′13″W, el. 3,481 feet (1,061 m)
- Etta Reservoir, 45°39′25″N 104°14′30″W, el. 3,478 feet (1,060 m)
- Evans Reservoir, 45°57′20″N 104°49′44″W, el. 3,143 feet (958 m)
- Flat Reservoir, 45°46′50″N 104°11′50″W, el. 3,576 feet (1,090 m)
- Gergen Reservoir, 45°35′31″N 104°14′42″W, el. 3,743 feet (1,141 m)
- Gravel Pit Reservoir, 45°37′56″N 104°04′05″W, el. 3,343 feet (1,019 m)
- Gros Ventre Reservoir, 45°40′34″N 104°33′12″W, el. 3,291 feet (1,003 m)
- Herman Reservoir, 45°45′12″N 104°10′07″W, el. 3,373 feet (1,028 m)
- Horse Killer Reservoir, 45°43′19″N 104°15′25″W, el. 3,402 feet (1,037 m)
- J Oliver Reservoir, 45°12′24″N 104°12′38″W, el. 3,314 feet (1,010 m)
- Jay Reservoir, 45°37′09″N 104°15′45″W, el. 3,592 feet (1,095 m)
- L O Reservoir, 45°47′18″N 104°09′46″W, el. 3,399 feet (1,036 m)
- L/W Reservoir, 45°44′47″N 104°12′12″W, el. 3,504 feet (1,068 m)
- Lampkin Gulch Reservoir, 45°44′16″N 104°15′29″W, el. 3,494 feet (1,065 m)
- Lindsey Reservoir, 45°33′26″N 104°05′06″W, el. 3,402 feet (1,037 m)
- Little Britches Reservoir, 45°56′31″N 104°50′27″W, el. 3,182 feet (970 m)
- Lone Tree Reservoir Number One, 45°40′16″N 104°32′21″W, el. 3,284 feet (1,001 m)
- Lone Tree Reservoir Number Two, 45°39′34″N 104°33′30″W, el. 3,330 feet (1,010 m)
- Long Reservoir, 45°40′00″N 104°30′43″W, el. 3,274 feet (998 m)
- Maverick Reservoir, 45°37′52″N 104°15′14″W, el. 3,468 feet (1,057 m)
- Mobray Reservoir Number 2, 45°42′29″N 104°11′10″W, el. 3,563 feet (1,086 m)
- Mobray Reservoir Number 3, 45°42′33″N 104°11′24″W, el. 3,586 feet (1,093 m)
- Navaho Reservoir, 45°40′23″N 104°35′30″W, el. 3,343 feet (1,019 m)
- Pendleton Reservoir, 45°38′01″N 104°07′01″W, el. 3,425 feet (1,044 m)
- Pentecost Reservoir, 45°23′01″N 104°57′45″W, el. 3,310 feet (1,010 m)
- Phillippi Reservoir, 45°19′31″N 104°49′21″W, el. 3,543 feet (1,080 m)
- Pot Hole Reservoir, 45°37′24″N 104°08′16″W, el. 3,602 feet (1,098 m)
- Schmidt Reservoir, 45°55′31″N 104°47′57″W, el. 3,264 feet (995 m)
- Section 21 Reservoir, 45°38′25″N 104°05′09″W, el. 3,422 feet (1,043 m)
- Sioux Reservoir, 45°40′35″N 104°34′16″W, el. 3,304 feet (1,007 m)
- Summers Reservoir, 45°38′23″N 104°14′46″W, el. 3,514 feet (1,071 m)
- Trenk Reservoir, 45°44′02″N 104°43′25″W, el. 3,455 feet (1,053 m)
- Ute Reservoir, 45°41′11″N 104°33′20″W, el. 3,291 feet (1,003 m)
- V-Bar-S Reservoir, 45°42′47″N 104°15′33″W, el. 3,445 feet (1,050 m)
- West Lindsey Reservoir, 45°33′17″N 104°05′42″W, el. 3,383 feet (1,031 m)
- West Plum Creek Reservoir, 45°37′42″N 104°06′00″W, el. 3,455 feet (1,053 m)
- Wichiup Reservoir, 45°41′07″N 104°31′09″W, el. 3,251 feet (991 m)

== See also ==
- List of lakes in Montana
