= List of lakes of Richland County, Montana =

There are at least 14 named lakes and reservoirs in Richland County, Montana.

== Lakes ==
- Burns Lake, 47°22′27″N 104°25′02″W, el. 1,988 feet (606 m)
- Fox Lake, 47°40′51″N 104°39′29″W, el. 2,349 feet (716 m)

== Reservoirs ==
- Candee Pond, 47°57′39″N 105°03′23″W, el. 2,359 feet (719 m)
- Erickson Reservoir, 47°49′25″N 104°27′04″W, el. 2,431 feet (741 m)
- Factory Lake, 47°42′48″N 104°07′36″W, el. 1,919 feet (585 m)
- Fatzinger Reservoir, 47°55′28″N 105°03′50″W, el. 2,254 feet (687 m)
- Gartside Lake, 47°35′06″N 104°16′14″W, el. 1,982 feet (604 m)
- Gartside Reservoir, 47°35′07″N 104°16′17″W, el. 2,008 feet (612 m)
- Kuester Lake, 47°41′28″N 104°58′09″W, el. 2,388 feet (728 m)
- Latka Reservoir, 47°48′27″N 104°49′29″W, el. 2,362 feet (720 m)
- McGlynn Reservoir, 47°39′48″N 104°04′26″W, el. 1,965 feet (599 m)
- Prevost Reservoir Number 2, 47°43′36″N 104°30′08″W, el. 2,487 feet (758 m)
- Vaux Reservoir Number One, 47°43′40″N 104°13′34″W, el. 2,070 feet (630 m)
- Vaux Reservoir Number Two, 47°43′48″N 104°14′10″W, el. 2,100 feet (640 m)

== See also ==
- List of lakes in Montana
