= List of lakes of Musselshell County, Montana =

There are at least 8 named lakes and reservoirs in Musselshell County, Montana.

== Lakes ==
- Busse Water, 46°16′46″N 108°21′51″W, el. 4,094 feet (1,248 m)
- Des Moines Lakes, 46°32′32″N 108°51′51″W, el. 3,740 feet (1,140 m)
- Devils Hole Lake, 46°38′02″N 108°59′13″W, el. 4,039 feet (1,231 m)
- Lake Thom, 46°32′53″N 108°43′08″W, el. 3,609 feet (1,100 m)
- May Martin Lake, 46°30′30″N 108°43′16″W, el. 3,586 feet (1,093 m)
- Miller Lake, 46°41′13″N 108°49′14″W, el. 3,868 feet (1,179 m)
- Talbot Lake, 46°32′11″N 108°41′51″W, el. 3,615 feet (1,102 m)

== Reservoirs ==
- Lake Mason, 46°32′44″N 108°39′17″W, el. 3,612 feet (1,101 m)

== See also ==
- List of lakes in Montana
