= Crystal Lake (Fergus County, Montana) =

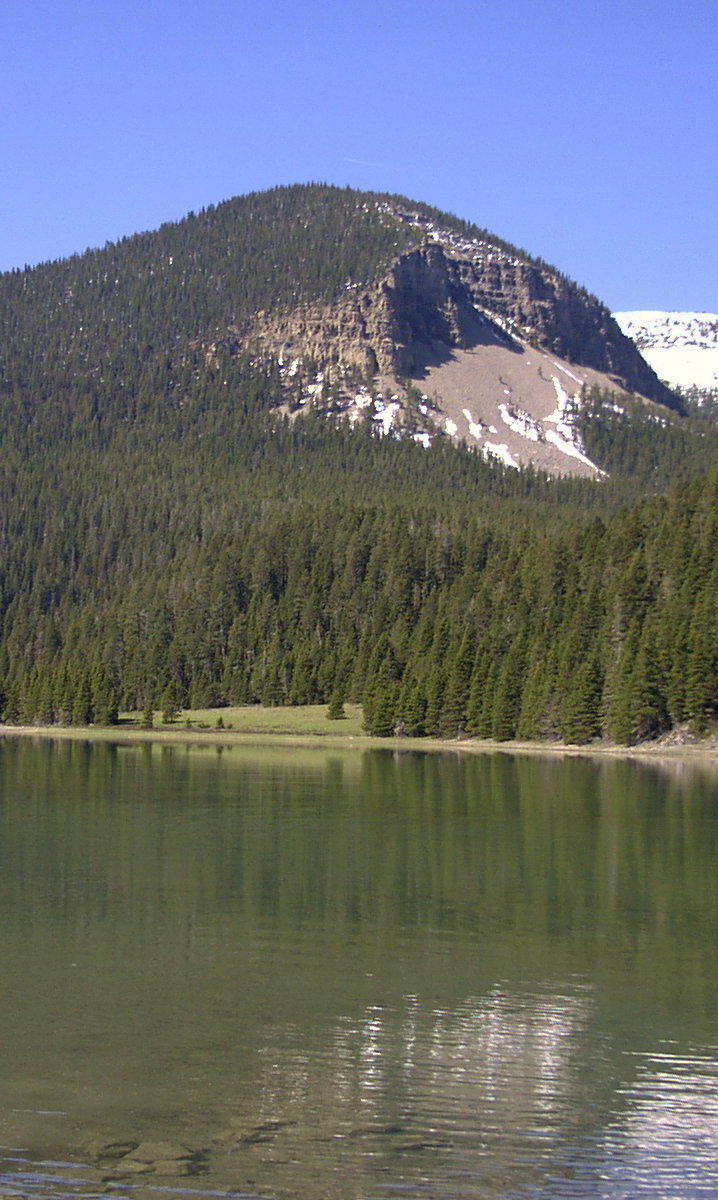
- Crystal Lake

- Location in Montana
- Location: Fergus County, Montana, United States
- Coordinates: 46°47′59″N 109°30′51″W
- Type: Natural/Fresh Water Lake
- Primary inflows: Big Rock Creek
- Primary outflows: Big Rock Creek
- Basin countries: United States
- Max. length: 3,250 ft (990 m)
- Max. width: 1,070 ft (330 m)
- Surface area: 45.7 acres (18.5 ha)
- Max. depth: 15 ft (4.6 m)
- Surface elevation: 6,014 ft (1,833 m)

Crystal Lake is a 45-acre (18 ha) body of water in the Big Snowy Mountains in Fergus County, Montana, United States. The lake is located 18 miles south of Lewistown in the Lewis and Clark National Forest. The Forest Service's Crystal Lake Campground is located at the lake's southern tip. The lake is stocked annually with rainbow trout. Crystal Lake offers camping, hiking, and fishing located on an island of wild mountains surrounded by prairie. The lake is in the Big Snowy Mountains which are one of the small “island” ranges that dot central Montana.
