= List of lakes of Israel =

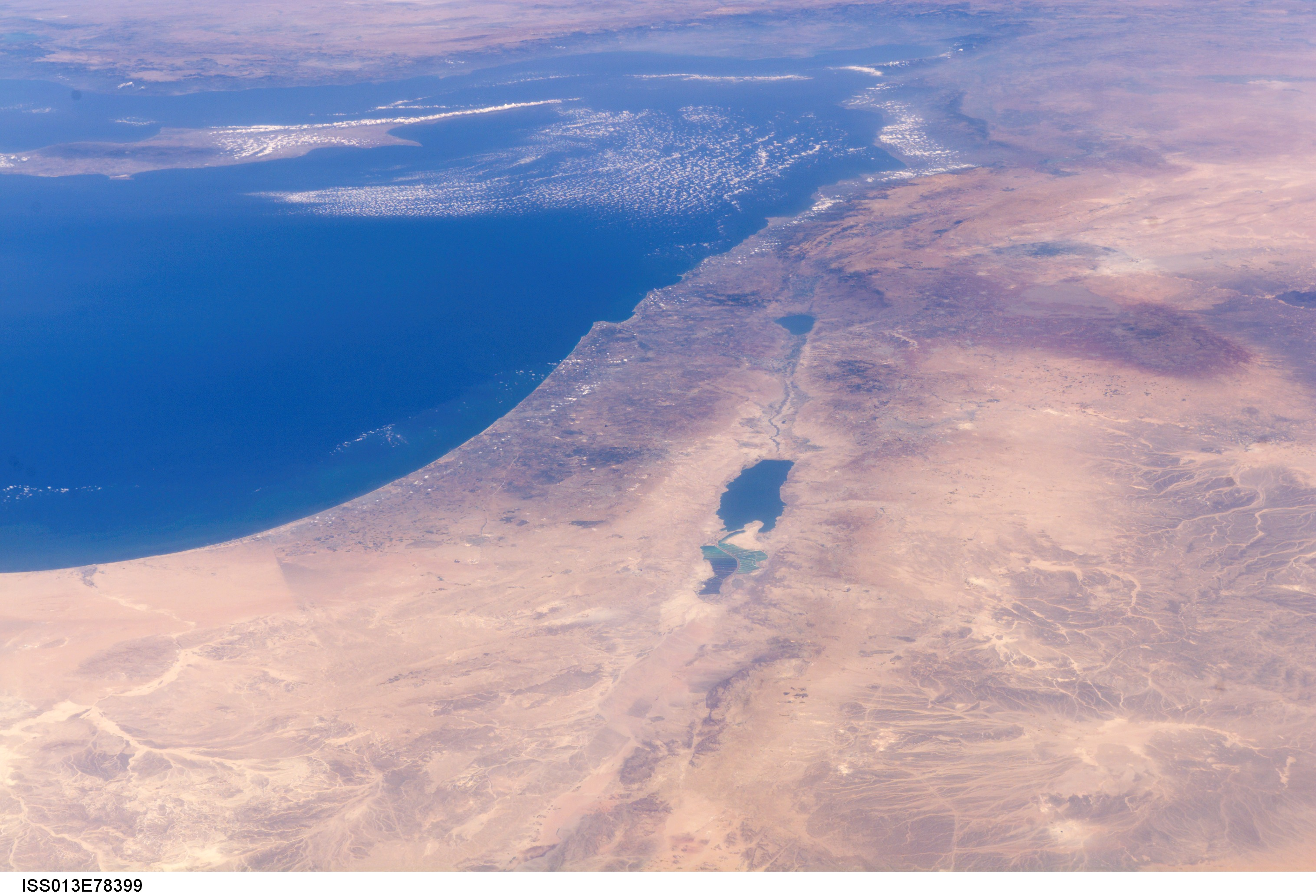
Dead Sea (foreground) and Sea of Galilee (background), taken from the ISS in 2006

The following notable lakes are located completely or partially within the borders of the State of Israel:

- Sea of Galilee
- Hula Valley
- Dead Sea*
- Rishon LeZion lake
- Dalton lake
- Qaraoun lake
- Zohar lake
- Agam lake
- Ayanot lake
- Darom lake
- Yesodot lake
- Netser Hazani lake
- Mahoz marsh

*Note: the Dead Sea is known more as the third Israeli sea for its salty water.
