= List of lakes of Dawson County, Montana =

There are at least 28 named lakes and reservoirs in Dawson County, Montana.

== Reservoirs ==
- Bailer Reservoir, 46°55′00″N 104°44′19″W, el. 2,205 feet (672 m)
- Big Drop Reservoir, 46°53′40″N 104°38′38″W, el. 2,379 feet (725 m)
- Camp Reservoir, 46°53′38″N 104°38′17″W, el. 2,385 feet (727 m)
- Circle Reservoir, 47°32′18″N 105°13′44″W, el. 2,503 feet (763 m)
- Crisafulli Lake, 47°07′53″N 104°44′42″W, el. 2,159 feet (658 m)
- Deer Creek Reservoir, 47°14′42″N 105°04′38″W, el. 2,717 feet (828 m)
- Forks Reservoir, 46°53′14″N 104°39′28″W, el. 2,326 feet (709 m)
- Gagena Reservoir, 46°53′28″N 104°31′18″W, el. 2,648 feet (807 m)
- Hollecker Lake, 47°07′45″N 104°43′38″W, el. 2,083 feet (635 m)
- Hollecker Reservoir, 47°07′48″N 104°43′38″W, el. 2,083 feet (635 m)
- Jack Downs Reservoir, 47°10′30″N 105°06′38″W, el. 2,641 feet (805 m)
- Johnson Reservoir, 47°18′52″N 105°05′46″W, el. 2,657 feet (810 m)
- Keeland Reservoir, 47°38′42″N 105°01′31″W, el. 2,474 feet (754 m)
- Lindsay Reservoir, 47°13′03″N 105°09′05″W, el. 2,694 feet (821 m)
- Longs Reservoir, 47°38′28″N 105°01′05″W, el. 2,477 feet (755 m)
- Malkuch Reservoir, 47°09′45″N 105°00′47″W, el. 2,513 feet (766 m)
- Malkuch Reservoir, 47°09′54″N 105°18′56″W, el. 2,926 feet (892 m)
- Milliron Reservoir Number 1, 47°10′22″N 104°24′57″W, el. 2,303 feet (702 m)
- Milliron Reservoir Number 2, 47°09′12″N 104°23′58″W, el. 2,306 feet (703 m)
- Prairie Goat Reservoir, 46°53′44″N 104°38′13″W, el. 2,382 feet (726 m)
- Roy Richey Reservoir, 47°38′48″N 105°07′02″W, el. 2,457 feet (749 m)
- Senner Reservoir, 47°31′18″N 104°48′56″W, el. 2,726 feet (831 m)
- Twin Forks Reservoir, 46°53′33″N 104°35′16″W, el. 2,461 feet (750 m)
- Twin Forks Reservoir, 46°53′42″N 104°35′14″W, el. 2,461 feet (750 m)
- Upper Labell Reservoir, 46°53′02″N 104°35′21″W, el. 2,421 feet (738 m)
- Upper Magpie Reservoir, 46°56′48″N 104°39′26″W, el. 2,323 feet (708 m)
- Wold Reservoir, 47°38′00″N 105°00′09″W, el. 2,477 feet (755 m)
- Wolff Reservoir, 47°10′36″N 105°04′32″W, el. 2,595 feet (791 m)

== See also ==
- List of lakes in Montana
