= List of lakes of Yellowstone County, Montana =

There are at least 7 named lakes and reservoirs in Yellowstone County, Montana.

== Lakes ==
- Alkali Pond, 46°07′35″N 108°53′20″W, el. 3,822 feet (1,165 m)
- Lake Elmo, 45°50′27″N 108°28′32″W, el. 3,199 feet (975 m)
- Broadview Pond, 46°06′25″N 108°52′59″W, el. 3,858 feet (1,176 m)
- Twin Lakes, 45°59′32″N 108°50′00″W, el. 3,750 feet (1,140 m)

== Reservoirs ==
- Anita Reservoir, 45°55′54″N 108°00′02″W, el. 3,022 feet (921 m)
- Anita Reservoir, 45°56′00″N 107°59′56″W, el. 3,018 feet (920 m)
- Rattlesnake Reservoir, 45°53′46″N 108°25′32″W, el. 3,199 feet (975 m)

== See also ==
- List of lakes in Montana
