= List of lakes of Fallon County, Montana =

There are at least 6 named lakes and reservoirs in Fallon County, Montana.

== Lakes ==
- Lake Baker, 46°21′57″N 104°16′38″W, el. 2,930 feet (890 m)

== Reservoirs ==
- Buffalo Reservoir, 46°15′57″N 104°09′19″W, el. 3,025 feet (922 m)
- Lake Baker, 46°22′06″N 104°16′20″W, el. 2,963 feet (903 m)
- Rush Hall Reservoir, 46°35′54″N 104°16′30″W, el. 3,002 feet (915 m)
- South Sandstone Reservoir, 46°20′20″N 104°28′41″W, el. 2,861 feet (872 m)
- Sportsman Pond, 46°09′59″N 104°23′34″W, el. 3,287 feet (1,002 m)

== See also ==
- List of lakes in Montana
