= List of lakes of Golden Valley County, Montana =

There are at least two lakes and a reservoir in Golden Valley County, Montana.

== Lakes ==
- Dry Lake, 46°20′44″N 108°59′23″W, el. 3,556 feet (1,084 m)
- McLean Lake, 46°44′36″N 109°09′59″W, el. 5,627 feet (1,715 m)

== See also ==
- List of lakes in Montana
