= List of lakes of Big Horn County, Montana =

There are at least 18 named lakes and reservoirs in Big Horn County, Montana.

== Lakes ==
- Arapooish Pond, 45°45′17″N 107°34′02″W, el. 2,874 feet (876 m)
- Crater Lake (Big Horn County, Montana), 45°17′46″N 108°24′40″W, el. 7,313 feet (2,229 m)
- Little Hawk Lake, 45°35′51″N 106°55′25″W, el. 3,428 feet (1,045 m)
- Muddy Lake, 45°25′07″N 106°49′58″W, el. 4,459 feet (1,359 m)

== Reservoirs ==
- Bighorn Reservoirs, 45°18′24″N 107°57′29″W, el. 3,642 feet (1,110 m)
- Brown Reservoir, 45°10′03″N 107°18′47″W, el. 3,747 feet (1,142 m)
- Chalk Butte Reservoir, 45°11′40″N 107°18′38″W, el. 3,655 feet (1,114 m)
- Halfway Reservoir, 45°09′43″N 107°21′04″W, el. 3,743 feet (1,141 m)
- Liming Reservoir, 45°12′50″N 107°18′33″W, el. 3,586 feet (1,093 m)
- Lodge Grass Reservoir, 45°10′00″N 107°36′02″W, el. 4,144 feet (1,263 m)
- Lodge Grass Storage Reservoir, 45°09′50″N 107°35′49″W, el. 4,144 feet (1,263 m)
- Lower Indian Creek Reservoir, 45°16′21″N 107°00′48″W, el. 4,108 feet (1,252 m)
- Rednose Reservoir, 45°32′10″N 106°59′28″W, el. 3,448 feet (1,051 m)
- Steinhilber Reservoir, 45°12′39″N 107°15′06″W, el. 3,701 feet (1,128 m)
- Tongue River Reservoir, 45°07′50″N 106°45′58″W, el. 3,442 feet (1,049 m)
- Two Moon Reservoir, 45°33′59″N 106°52′11″W, el. 3,415 feet (1,041 m)
- Upper Indian Creek Reservoir, 45°16′13″N 107°01′18″W, el. 4,121 feet (1,256 m)
- Yellowtail Afterbay Reservoir, 45°19′06″N 107°55′26″W, el. 3,209 feet (978 m)

== See also ==
- List of lakes in Montana
