= List of lakes of Chouteau County, Montana =

There are at least 27 named lakes and reservoirs in Chouteau County, Montana.

== Lakes ==
- Antelope Lake, 47°47′38″N 111°07′22″W, el. 3,238 feet (987 m)
- Big Lake, 47°37′56″N 110°24′12″W, el. 3,150 feet (960 m)
- Big Sag Lake, 47°36′09″N 110°43′36″W, el. 3,455 feet (1,053 m)
- Clear Lake, 47°45′02″N 110°18′58″W, el. 3,123 feet (952 m)
- Floweree Lake, 47°44′43″N 111°04′55″W, el. 3,281 feet (1,000 m)
- Harwood Lake, 47°44′38″N 110°24′54″W, el. 3,205 feet (977 m)
- Kingsbury Lake, 47°34′13″N 110°21′31″W, el. 3,186 feet (971 m)
- Lonesome Lake, 48°15′30″N 110°13′10″W, el. 2,746 feet (837 m)
- Lost Lake, 47°38′07″N 110°28′59″W, el. 3,343 feet (1,019 m)
- Rocky Lake, 47°46′20″N 110°23′46″W, el. 3,363 feet (1,025 m)
- Sand Lake, 47°38′15″N 110°30′47″W, el. 3,592 feet (1,095 m)
- Shonkin Lake, 47°39′55″N 110°32′38″W, el. 3,153 feet (961 m)
- White Lake, 47°41′17″N 110°25′39″W, el. 3,150 feet (960 m)

== Reservoirs ==
- Birkeland Reservoir, 47°41′34″N 110°47′01″W, el. 3,304 feet (1,007 m)
- Boneau Reservoir, 48°17′54″N 109°51′40″W, el. 3,195 feet (974 m)
- Bonneau Reservoir, 48°17′48″N 109°51′03″W, el. 3,284 feet (1,001 m)
- Cowan Reservoir, 48°15′33″N 109°54′18″W, el. 3,261 feet (994 m)
- Cowan Reservoir, 48°15′30″N 109°54′03″W, el. 3,232 feet (985 m)
- Dammel Reservoir, 47°42′32″N 110°08′27″W, el. 2,982 feet (909 m)
- Dry Fork Reservoir, 48°17′17″N 109°53′01″W, el. 3,146 feet (959 m)
- Eightmile Springs, 47°48′38″N 110°50′07″W, el. 2,926 feet (892 m)
- Flick Lake, 47°43′10″N 111°13′10″W, el. 3,501 feet (1,067 m)
- Panton Coulee Reservoir, 47°36′11″N 110°08′47″W, el. 3,087 feet (941 m)
- Pirate Lake, 47°28′30″N 110°42′39″W, el. 4,153 feet (1,266 m)
- Rice Reservoir, 47°40′11″N 110°48′35″W, el. 3,356 feet (1,023 m)
- Seifort Reservoir, 47°58′39″N 109°48′41″W, el. 3,261 feet (994 m)
- White Elephant Reservoir, 48°07′25″N 111°14′03″W, el. 3,310 feet (1,010 m)

== See also ==
- List of lakes in Montana
