= List of lakes of Rosebud County, Montana =

There are at least 69 named lakes and reservoirs in Rosebud County, Montana.

== Reservoirs ==
- Absolen Reservoir, 46°32′10″N 106°45′33″W, el. 2,717 feet (828 m)
- Barley Reservoir, 46°23′42″N 106°22′02″W, el. 2,615 feet (797 m)
- Barley Reservoirs, 46°23′40″N 106°22′01″W, el. 2,615 feet (797 m)
- Big Reservoir, 46°28′16″N 106°35′36″W, el. 2,782 feet (848 m)
- Bighead Reservoir, 45°31′17″N 106°23′02″W, el. 3,248 feet (990 m)
- Black Canyon Reservoir, 45°26′08″N 106°14′01″W, el. 3,996 feet (1,218 m)
- Black Coulee Reservoir, 46°24′07″N 106°40′15″W, el. 2,667 feet (813 m)
- Black Sea Reservoir, 46°39′30″N 107°18′48″W, el. 2,881 feet (878 m)
- Blacktail Reservoir, 46°39′20″N 107°01′57″W, el. 2,782 feet (848 m)
- Boies Reservoir, 46°44′55″N 106°14′04″W, el. 2,815 feet (858 m)
- Bowman Reservoir, 45°30′17″N 106°16′31″W, el. 3,248 feet (990 m)
- Boyce Reservoir, 45°13′24″N 106°18′24″W, el. 3,835 feet (1,169 m)
- Bridge Creek Reservoir, 45°30′10″N 106°14′31″W, el. 3,389 feet (1,033 m)
- Brown Coulee Reservoir, 46°39′12″N 107°03′34″W, el. 2,808 feet (856 m)
- Castle Rock Lake, 45°53′35″N 106°38′22″W, el. 3,235 feet (986 m)
- Coal Bank Reservoir, 45°18′58″N 106°17′43″W, el. 4,065 feet (1,239 m)
- Donald Reservoir, 46°32′34″N 106°08′34″W, el. 2,743 feet (836 m)
- Donley Reservoir, 46°27′30″N 106°55′50″W, el. 2,661 feet (811 m)
- Donleys Reservoir, 46°27′27″N 106°55′47″W, el. 2,661 feet (811 m)
- East Fork Reservoir, 46°28′39″N 106°30′13″W, el. 2,841 feet (866 m)
- East Fork Reservoir, 45°24′24″N 106°16′02″W, el. 3,629 feet (1,106 m)
- Edith Reservoir, 45°21′48″N 106°19′27″W, el. 3,878 feet (1,182 m)
- Experimental Pasture Reservoir, 45°18′48″N 106°18′55″W, el. 4,062 feet (1,238 m)
- Fields Reservoir, 45°41′56″N 106°22′40″W, el. 3,143 feet (958 m)
- Fisherman Dan Reservoir, 46°26′55″N 106°21′47″W, el. 2,802 feet (854 m)
- Green Creek Reservoir, 45°23′26″N 106°18′30″W, el. 3,432 feet (1,046 m)
- Hamilton Draw Reservoir, 45°13′29″N 106°21′11″W, el. 3,665 feet (1,117 m)
- Haywood Reservoir, 45°14′46″N 106°22′39″W, el. 3,809 feet (1,161 m)
- Hertzler Reservoir, 45°14′59″N 106°21′44″W, el. 3,839 feet (1,170 m)
- Hoover Reservoir, 45°11′43″N 106°17′39″W, el. 3,871 feet (1,180 m)
- Horse Creek Basin Reservoir, 45°18′01″N 106°16′45″W, el. 4,003 feet (1,220 m)
- Kerns Reservoir, 46°38′06″N 107°02′08″W, el. 2,776 feet (846 m)
- King Creek Reservoir, 45°28′13″N 106°17′25″W, el. 3,346 feet (1,020 m)
- Kreger Reservoir, 46°50′16″N 106°07′52″W, el. 2,848 feet (868 m)
- Lee Creek Reservoir, 45°13′36″N 106°18′34″W, el. 3,825 feet (1,166 m)
- Lei Reservoir, 45°15′08″N 106°19′51″W, el. 3,898 feet (1,188 m)
- Lower Blacktail Reservoir, 46°38′00″N 107°04′09″W, el. 2,769 feet (844 m)
- Needle Butte Reservoir, 46°47′03″N 106°38′36″W, el. 2,999 feet (914 m)
- Newell Creek Reservoir, 45°28′23″N 106°13′16″W, el. 3,337 feet (1,017 m)
- O'Dell Reservoir, 45°19′49″N 106°20′33″W, el. 3,999 feet (1,219 m)
- Pittman Reservoir, 45°24′37″N 106°17′40″W, el. 3,366 feet (1,026 m)
- Poker Jim Reservoir, 45°18′03″N 106°20′31″W, el. 3,865 feet (1,178 m)
- Poker Jim Reservoir Number Two, 45°19′30″N 106°23′08″W, el. 4,029 feet (1,228 m)
- Poker Teechee Reservoir, 45°22′55″N 106°21′57″W, el. 3,852 feet (1,174 m)
- Reavis Reservoir, 45°16′05″N 106°21′17″W, el. 3,930 feet (1,200 m)
- Red Rock Reservoir Number One, 45°17′48″N 106°19′34″W, el.3,875 feet (1,181 m)
- Red Rock Reservoir Number Two, 45°17′42″N 106°17′56″W, el. 4,042 feet (1,232 m)
- Redeen, 46°36′48″N 106°36′26″W, el. 2,821 feet (860 m)
- Roberts Gulch Reservoir, 45°19′51″N 106°25′34″W, el. 4,012 feet (1,223 m)
- Round Butte Reservoir, 46°47′55″N 106°39′34″W, el. 2,966 feet (904 m)
- Round Cow Reservoir, 45°13′44″N 106°18′14″W, el. 3,848 feet (1,173 m)
- Schaudel Reservoir, 45°29′28″N 106°17′17″W, el. 3,205 feet (977 m)
- Skinny Reservoir, 45°21′56″N 106°19′13″W, el. 3,835 feet (1,169 m)
- Snyder Reservoir, 45°12′42″N 106°25′43″W, el. 3,757 feet (1,145 m)
- Stellar Lake, 46°45′04″N 106°47′20″W, el. 2,835 feet (864 m)
- Sunday Creek Reservoir, 46°45′47″N 106°32′33″W, el. 3,005 feet (916 m)
- Thebes Lake, 46°32′18″N 107°14′39″W, el. 2,871 feet (875 m)
- Three X Bar Reservoir, 45°16′44″N 106°19′05″W, el. 3,888 feet (1,185 m)
- Three X Bar Reservoir Number Two, 45°15′50″N 106°19′11″W, el. 3,944 feet (1,202 m)
- Timber Creek Basin Reservoir, 45°19′30″N 106°24′10″W, el. 3,871 feet (1,180 m)
- Timber Creek Reservoir, 45°18′36″N 106°24′57″W, el. 3,609 feet (1,100 m)
- Trail Creek Reservoir, 46°43′00″N 106°33′10″W, el. 3,012 feet (918 m)
- Wagner Reservoir, 46°49′00″N 106°47′34″W, el. 2,949 feet (899 m)
- Water Gap Reservoir, 45°16′47″N 106°16′54″W, el. 3,881 feet (1,183 m)
- Wolff Reservoir, 45°15′28″N 106°17′52″W, el. 3,989 feet (1,216 m)
- Woodard Reservoir, 45°13′45″N 106°26′57″W, el. 3,583 feet (1,092 m)
- Woodbury Reservoir, 45°11′56″N 106°19′47″W, el. 3,825 feet (1,166 m)
- Zempel Lake, 46°30′33″N 107°00′52″W, el. 2,687 feet (819 m)
- Zemple Lake, 46°30′30″N 107°00′50″W, el. 2,680 feet (820 m)

== See also ==
- List of lakes in Montana
