= List of lakes of Treasure County, Montana =

There are at least 4 named lakes and reservoirs in Treasure County, Montana.

== Reservoirs ==
- Haines Reservoir, 46°14′21″N 107°05′15″W, el. 2,923 feet (891 m)
- Horton Reservoir, 46°16′21″N 107°34′06″W, el. 3,094 feet (943 m)
- Larsens Reservoir, 46°16′30″N 107°32′05″W, el. 3,018 feet (920 m)
- Teds Reservoir, 46°15′12″N 107°30′40″W, el. 2,946 feet (898 m)

== See also ==
- List of lakes in Montana
