= List of lakes of Meagher County, Montana =

There are at least 36 named lakes and reservoirs in Meagher County, Montana.

== Lakes ==
- Camas Lake, 46°33′18″N 111°17′54″W, el. 7,356 feet (2,242 m)
- Castle Lake, 46°26′25″N 110°42′45″W, el. 6,883 feet (2,098 m)
- Coates Pond, 46°31′38″N 110°35′22″W, el. 6,155 feet (1,876 m)
- Crater Lake, 46°40′46″N 110°47′36″W, el. 5,882 feet (1,793 m)
- Edith Lake, 46°26′17″N 111°12′35″W, el. 8,012 feet (2,442 m)
- Forest Lake, 46°14′41″N 110°26′03″W, el. 6,496 feet (1,980 m)
- Grace Lake, 46°26′35″N 111°14′07″W, el. 8,104 feet (2,470 m)
- Hidden Lake, 46°26′54″N 111°14′07″W, el. 7,858 feet (2,395 m)
- Soldiers Lake, 46°40′18″N 111°10′32″W, el. 4,659 feet (1,420 m)
- Thorsens Pond, 46°32′01″N 110°37′22″W, el. 6,562 feet (2,000 m)
- Upper Baldy Lake, 46°26′22″N 111°14′28″W, el. 8,520 feet (2,600 m)

== Reservoirs ==
- Alkali Lake, 46°29′25″N 111°01′42″W, el. 5,105 feet (1,556 m)
- Ashford Tank, 46°46′31″N 111°21′30″W, el. 5,768 feet (1,758 m)
- Ayers Reservoir, 46°39′19″N 111°12′52″W, el. 5,007 feet (1,526 m)
- Bair Reservoir, 46°35′00″N 110°34′03″W, el. 5,328 feet (1,624 m)
- Bonanza Reservoir, 46°27′30″N 110°34′38″W, el. 5,574 feet (1,699 m)
- Buckingham Reservoir, 46°39′26″N 110°57′14″W, el. 5,279 feet (1,609 m)
- Christensen Reservoir, 46°33′16″N 110°32′17″W, el. 5,318 feet (1,621 m)
- Doggett Reservoir, 46°40′14″N 111°13′36″W, el. 4,908 feet (1,496 m)
- Flagstaff Reservoir, 46°32′52″N 110°31′35″W, el. 5,249 feet (1,600 m)
- Gipsy Lake, 46°30′12″N 111°12′39″W, el. 6,335 feet (1,931 m)
- Hamen Reservoir, 46°18′22″N 110°42′35″W, el. 5,466 feet (1,666 m)
- Hanson Reservoir, 46°32′18″N 111°01′57″W, el. 4,924 feet (1,501 m)
- Higgins Reservoir, 46°17′36″N 110°44′24″W, el. 5,384 feet (1,641 m)
- Jackson Lake, 46°29′59″N 111°04′42″W, el. 5,171 feet (1,576 m)
- Keep Cool Reservoir, 46°40′55″N 111°14′48″W, el. 4,810 feet (1,470 m)
- Lake Sutherlin, 46°37′18″N 110°44′50″W, el. 5,489 feet (1,673 m)
- Lucas Reservoir, 46°16′24″N 110°41′57″W, el. 5,453 feet (1,662 m)
- Martinsdale Reservoir, 46°27′07″N 110°16′04″W, el. 4,783 feet (1,458 m)
- Newlan Creek Reservoir, 46°38′13″N 110°56′16″W, el. 5,292 feet (1,613 m)
- Stoyanoff Lake, 46°41′36″N 111°15′44″W, el. 4,790 feet (1,460 m)
- Voldseth Reservoir, 46°23′09″N 110°30′31″W, el. 5,502 feet (1,677 m)
- Wertz Reservoir, 46°24′13″N 110°57′59″W, el. 5,358 feet (1,633 m)
- Wertz Reservoir, 46°24′12″N 110°58′21″W, el. 5,358 feet (1,633 m)
- Whitetail Reservoir, 46°43′32″N 111°04′40″W, el. 4,826 feet (1,471 m)
- Willow Creek Reservoir, 46°31′09″N 110°48′43″W, el. 5,699 feet (1,737 m)

== See also ==
- List of lakes in Montana
