= List of lakes of Blaine County, Montana =

There are at least 52 named lakes and reservoirs in Blaine County, Montana.

== Lakes ==
- Alkali Lake, 48°58′17″N 108°38′43″W, el. 2,979 feet (908 m)
- Bigby Lake, 48°20′51″N 108°35′44″W, el. 2,529 feet (771 m)
- Duck Lake, 48°40′19″N 108°30′18″W, el. 3,091 feet (942 m)
- Fifteen Mile Lake, 48°40′55″N 109°00′28″W, el. 2,720 feet (830 m)
- Hornbeck Lake, 48°42′19″N 108°32′03″W, el. 3,107 feet (947 m)
- J Lake, 48°17′55″N 108°38′16″W, el. 2,598 feet (792 m)
- Lake Seventeen, 48°04′44″N 108°52′08″W, el. 3,025 feet (922 m)
- Martin Lake, 48°44′11″N 109°30′39″W, el. 2,717 feet (828 m)
- Mud Lake, 48°35′20″N 108°36′51″W, el. 2,736 feet (834 m)
- Old Woman Lake, 48°20′30″N 108°29′22″W, el. 2,612 feet (796 m)
- Ross Lake, 48°17′21″N 109°12′13″W, el. 3,566 feet (1,087 m)
- Silver Bow Lake, 48°50′40″N 108°53′31″W, el. 3,369 feet (1,027 m)
- Skinners Lake, 48°02′47″N 108°45′24″W, el. 3,258 feet (993 m)

== Reservoirs ==
- Als Coulee Reservoir, 48°00′44″N 109°11′14″W, el. 3,481 feet (1,061 m)
- Anderson Reservoir, 48°15′20″N 108°56′53″W, el. 3,189 feet (972 m)
- Black Coulee, 48°41′36″N 108°23′44″W, el. 2,907 feet (886 m)
- Blanch Reservoir, 47°59′48″N 109°10′26″W, el. 3,461 feet (1,055 m)
- Brush Shack Reservoir, 47°58′16″N 109°09′41″W, el. 3,386 feet (1,032 m)
- Bud Reservoir, 47°57′09″N 109°12′04″W, el. 3,343 feet (1,019 m)
- Butch Reservoir, 47°57′08″N 109°07′00″W, el. 3,281 feet (1,000 m)
- Dalberg Reservoir, 48°07′52″N 109°08′00″W, el. 3,793 feet (1,156 m)
- Down Reservoir, 48°31′25″N 108°20′58″W, el. 2,795 feet (852 m)
- Faber Reservoir, 48°15′48″N 109°08′11″W, el. 3,599 feet (1,097 m)
- Four O'Clock Reservoir, 48°01′14″N 109°11′36″W, el. 3,570 feet (1,090 m)
- Grasshopper Reservoir, 48°25′02″N 109°16′57″W, el. 3,084 feet (940 m)
- Harbolt Reservoir, 48°50′07″N 109°04′27″W, el. 2,848 feet (868 m)
- Holm Reservoir, 48°50′00″N 109°26′03″W, el. 2,631 feet (802 m)
- J Lake, 48°18′06″N 108°38′21″W, el. 2,598 feet (792 m)
- Juniper Reservoir, 47°53′05″N 109°06′42″W, el. 3,261 feet (994 m)
- Lower Hansen Reservoir, 48°07′29″N 109°10′19″W, el. 3,602 feet (1,098 m)
- McLaren Reservoir, 48°48′42″N 109°25′21″W, el. 2,615 feet (797 m)
- Newhouse Reservoir, 48°16′50″N 108°58′52″W, el. 3,225 feet (983 m)
- Nolan Reservoir, 47°57′02″N 109°18′24″W, el. 3,570 feet (1,090 m)
- North Chinook Reservoir, 48°46′00″N 109°18′54″W, el. 2,582 feet (787 m)
- Old Woman Reservoir, 48°18′15″N 108°41′08″W, el. 2,641 feet (805 m)
- Putnam Lake, 48°09′38″N 108°56′32″W, el. 3,182 feet (970 m)
- Richmond Reservoir, 48°47′48″N 109°01′21″W, el. 2,844 feet (867 m)
- Rieve Reservoir, 48°14′17″N 109°10′45″W, el. 3,760 feet (1,150 m)
- Sandpiper Reservoir, 47°55′46″N 109°11′12″W, el. 3,284 feet (1,001 m)
- Seventeen Mile Reservoir, 48°05′00″N 108°52′03″W, el. 3,025 feet (922 m)
- Staff Reservoir, 48°28′30″N 109°25′15″W, el. 2,953 feet (900 m)
- Suction Creek Reservoir, 48°01′37″N 109°00′35″W, el. 3,097 feet (944 m)
- T U Reservoir, 48°05′38″N 109°16′51″W, el. 3,707 feet (1,130 m)
- Thirtymile Reservoir, 48°31′05″N 108°44′29″W, el. 2,349 feet (716 m)
- Threemile Reservoir, 48°26′12″N 108°37′59″W, el. 2,352 feet (717 m)
- Tule Lake, 48°40′51″N 109°03′08″W, el. 2,717 feet (828 m)
- Twin Reservoir, 48°44′56″N 109°14′23″W, el. 2,589 feet (789 m)
- Upper Hansen Reservoir, 48°08′44″N 109°10′52″W, el. 3,809 feet (1,161 m)
- Weigand Reservoir, 48°15′37″N 108°24′57″W, el. 2,543 feet (775 m)
- Weigand Reservoir, 48°15′42″N 108°24′33″W, el. 2,536 feet (773 m)
- White Bear Reservoir, 48°20′26″N 108°57′10″W, el. 3,238 feet (987 m)
- Wren Reservoir, 47°54′51″N 109°05′46″W, el. 3,241 feet (988 m)

== See also ==
- List of lakes in Montana
