= List of lakes of Prairie County, Montana =

There are at least 15 named lakes and reservoirs in Prairie County, Montana.

== Lakes ==
=== Reservoirs ===
- Airport Reservoir. 46°38′46″N 105°00′33″W, el. 2,582 feet (787 m)
- Archdale Reservoir. 46°34′30″N 104°55′09″W, el. 2,562 feet (781 m)
- Ban Reservoir Number 1. 47°01′39″N 105°34′14″W, el. 2,854 feet (870 m)
- Clark Reservoir. 46°53′16″N 105°42′11″W, el. 2,818 feet (859 m)
- Coal Creek Reservoir. 46°50′45″N 105°13′49″W, el. 2,297 feet (700 m)
- Grant Reservoir. 46°52′22″N 105°38′46″W, el. 2,723 feet (830 m)
- Homestead Reservoir. 46°59′23″N 105°33′33″W, el. 2,759 feet (841 m)
- Horse Reservoir. 46°34′17″N 104°57′12″W, el. 2,743 feet (836 m)
- Hunter Creek Reservoir. 46°45′07″N 105°35′47″W, el. 2,467 feet (752 m)
- Innes Reservoir. 46°56′24″N 105°24′12″W, el. 2,589 feet (789 m)
- Little Garrison Reservoir. 46°51′34″N 104°36′59″W, el. 2,346 feet (715 m)
- McClure Reservoir. 46°52′18″N 105°30′42″W, el. 2,575 feet (785 m)
- Papps Reservoir. 46°56′24″N 105°29′29″W, el. 2,651 feet (808 m)
- Silvertip Reservoir. 46°52′09″N 105°35′29″W, el. 2,664 feet (812 m)
- South Fork Reservoir. 46°52′57″N 105°40′16″W, el. 2,759 feet (841 m)

== See also ==
- List of lakes in Montana
