= List of lakes of Sheridan County, Montana =

There are at least 28 named lakes and reservoirs in Sheridan County, Montana.

== Lakes ==
- Brightsmen Lake, 48°58′49″N 104°23′43″W, el. 2,257 feet (688 m)
- Brush Lake, 48°35′55″N 104°06′35″W, el. 1,959 feet (597 m)
- Capeneys Lake, 48°28′20″N 104°19′18″W, el. 1,939 feet (591 m)
- Clear Lake, 48°39′12″N 104°08′44″W, el. 2,018 feet (615 m)
- Comers Lake, 48°53′45″N 104°15′18″W, el. 2,287 feet (697 m)
- Dominek Lake, 48°43′33″N 104°05′33″W, el. 2,041 feet (622 m)
- Flat Lake, 48°54′43″N 104°05′12″W, el. 2,096 feet (639 m)
- Gaulke Lake, 48°54′01″N 104°03′08″W, el. 2,073 feet (632 m)
- Goose Lake, 48°48′47″N 104°04′17″W, el. 2,051 feet (625 m)
- Horseshoe Lake, 48°35′42″N 104°02′43″W, el. 1,965 feet (599 m)
- Johnson Lake, 48°59′11″N 104°22′27″W, el. 2,228 feet (679 m)
- Katy Lake, 48°31′30″N 104°12′23″W, el. 1,952 feet (595 m)
- Larson Slough, 48°57′25″N 104°11′28″W, el. 2,175 feet (663 m)
- Lochin Slough, 48°55′18″N 104°34′54″W, el. 2,356 feet (718 m)
- Lone Tree Lake, 48°56′28″N 104°13′39″W, el. 2,146 feet (654 m)
- Long Lake, 48°33′35″N 104°09′13″W, el. 1,952 feet (595 m)
- Mallard Pond, 48°34′21″N 104°08′27″W, el. 1,952 feet (595 m)
- Mattson Slough, 48°56′21″N 104°34′56″W, el. 2,395 feet (730 m)
- North Lake, 48°53′02″N 104°04′01″W, el. 2,080 feet (630 m)
- Park Lake, 48°53′57″N 104°18′22″W, el. 2,316 feet (706 m)
- Salt Lake, 48°59′48″N 104°18′01″W, el. 2,165 feet (660 m)
- Syme Slough, 48°54′28″N 104°35′55″W, el. 2,326 feet (709 m)
- Tadpole Lake, 48°48′03″N 104°10′19″W, el. 2,126 feet (648 m)
- Widgeon Slough, 48°57′53″N 104°14′49″W, el. 2,155 feet (657 m)

== Reservoirs ==
- Boxelder Lake, 48°47′12″N 104°33′15″W, el. 2,093 feet (638 m)
- Homestead Lake, 48°22′11″N 104°35′04″W, el. 1,929 feet (588 m)
- Homestead Lake, 48°24′30″N 104°34′14″W, el. 1,926 feet (587 m)
- Medicine Lake, 48°28′37″N 104°30′34″W, el. 1,936 feet (590 m)

== See also ==
- List of lakes in Montana
