= List of lakes of Custer County, Montana =

There are at least 23 named lakes and reservoirs in Custer County, Montana.

== Lakes ==
- Cook Lake, 46°24′18″N 105°51′24″W, el. 2,359 feet (719 m)
- Scanlan Lake, 46°24′13″N 105°51′11″W, el. 2,359 feet (719 m)

== Reservoirs ==
- Branum Lake, 46°23′14″N 105°51′59″W, el. 2,369 feet (722 m)
- Corny Coulee Reservoir, 46°26′06″N 106°43′05″W, el. 2,743 feet (836 m)
- Corral Creek Reservoir, 46°04′57″N 105°14′17″W, el. 2,844 feet (867 m)
- Dead Cow Reservoir, 46°24′47″N 105°11′42″W, el. 2,762 feet (842 m)
- Hall Reservoir, 46°30′53″N 105°45′23″W, el. 2,362 feet (720 m)
- Hamlick Reservoir, 46°46′01″N 105°52′59″W, el. 2,913 feet (888 m)
- Hay Creek Reservoir, 46°27′53″N 106°42′18″W, el. 2,644 feet (806 m)
- Jones Reservoir, 45°56′02″N 105°07′16″W, el. 2,969 feet (905 m)
- Love Reservoir, 45°53′42″N 105°09′32″W, el. 3,123 feet (952 m)
- McFarland Reservoir, 46°29′57″N 105°31′04″W, el. 2,664 feet (812 m)
- Morgan Creek Reservoir, 46°02′06″N 105°10′13″W, el. 2,802 feet (854 m)
- Noble Reservoir, 46°32′06″N 105°45′47″W, el. 2,379 feet (725 m)
- Noble Reservoir, 46°32′06″N 105°45′50″W, el. 2,379 feet (725 m)
- Physic Creek Reservoir, 46°45′26″N 105°39′18″W, el. 2,559 feet (780 m)
- Pine Hill Reservoir, 46°10′13″N 105°37′47″W, el. 2,664 feet (812 m)
- Pine Hills Reservoir, 46°10′18″N 105°37′56″W, el. 2,723 feet (830 m)
- Shoemaker, 46°31′30″N 105°00′02″W, el. 2,739 feet (835 m)
- Spotted Eagle Lake, 46°23′34″N 105°51′20″W, el. 2,362 feet (720 m)
- Tepee Butte Reservoir, 46°06′14″N 105°01′04″W, el. 2,841 feet (866 m)
- Willie Reservoir, 46°03′19″N 105°10′48″W, el. 2,762 feet (842 m)
- Witcher Reservoir, 45°47′25″N 105°29′39″W, el. 3,123 feet (952 m)

== See also ==
- List of lakes in Montana
