= List of lakes of Daniels County, Montana =

There are at least 6 named lakes and reservoirs in Daniels County, Montana.

== Lakes ==
- Paradis Pond, 48°53′27″N 105°16′31″W, el. 2,736 feet (834 m)

== Reservoirs ==
- Silver Lake, 48°55′44″N 105°36′33″W, el. 2,421 feet (738 m)
- Killenbeck Lake, 48°51′36″N 105°43′44″W, el. 2,526 feet (770 m)
- Killenbeck Reservoir, 48°51′51″N 105°43′27″W, el. 2,507 feet (764 m)
- Whitetail Reservoir, 48°53′28″N 105°09′22″W, el. 2,474 feet (754 m)
- Whitetail Storage Reservoir, 48°53′42″N 105°09′32″W, el. 2,497 feet (761 m)

== See also ==
- List of lakes in Montana
