= List of lakes of Cambodia =

This is a list of lakes in Cambodia.

- Tonlé Sap: a giant lake in the center of Cambodia.
- Yak Loum: a lake formed from a former crater.
