= List of lakes of Broadwater County, Montana =

There are at least 3 named lakes and reservoirs in Broadwater County, Montana.

== Lakes ==
- Boulder Lakes, 46°33′30″N 111°21′02″W, el. 7,552 feet (2,302 m)

== Reservoirs ==
- Plunket Lake, 46°04′41″N 111°34′44″W, el. 4,167 feet (1,270 m)
- Townsend Reservoir, 46°18′52″N 111°27′38″W, el. 4,065 feet (1,239 m)

== See also ==
- List of lakes in Montana
