= List of lakes of Petroleum County, Montana =

There are at least nine named lakes and reservoirs in Petroleum County, Montana, United States.

== Lakes ==
- Little Bear Lake, 47°06′37″N 108°28′32″W, el. 3,100 feet (940 m)
- Wild Horse Lake, 47°10′55″N 108°32′33″W, el. 3,038 feet (926 m)

== Reservoirs ==
- Headman-Field Reservoir, 47°30′54″N 108°02′13″W, el. 2,739 feet (835 m)
- Petrolia Lake, 46°56′07″N 108°14′38″W, el. 2,900 feet (880 m)
- Prtrolla Lake, 46°56′24″N 108°14′32″W, el. 2,900 feet (880 m)
- War Horse Lake, 47°06′33″N 108°31′40″W, el. 3,146 feet (959 m)
- War Horse Lake, 47°07′12″N 108°32′08″W, el. 3,136 feet (956 m)
- War Horse Lake, 47°08′06″N 108°35′14″W, el. 3,143 feet (958 m)
- Yellow Water Reservoir, 46°54′08″N 108°28′21″W, el. 3,117 feet (950 m)

== See also ==
- List of lakes in Montana
