= List of lakes of Silver Bow County, Montana =

There are at least 14 named lakes and reservoirs in Silver Bow County, Montana.

== Lakes ==
- Emerald Lake, 45°45′17″N 112°28′24″W, el. 8,747 feet (2,666 m)
- Fish Lake, 45°54′33″N 112°56′20″W, el. 7,976 feet (2,431 m)
- Mud Lake, 45°55′00″N 112°53′56″W, el. 8,291 feet (2,527 m)

== Reservoirs ==
- Basin Creek Reservoir, 45°51′15″N 112°32′45″W, el. 5,863 feet (1,787 m)
- High Service Reservoir, 46°02′09″N 112°32′43″W, el. 6,279 feet (1,914 m)
- Moulton Distribution Reservoir, 46°02′14″N 112°32′04″W, el. 6,384 feet (1,946 m)
- Moulton Reservoir, 46°05′24″N 112°00′33″W, el. 6,312 feet (1,924 m)
- Moulton Reservoir Number 2, 46°05′17″N 112°29′00″W, el. 7,024 feet (2,141 m)
- Moulton Reservoir Number One, 46°05′24″N 112°30′32″W, el. 6,752 feet (2,058 m)
- South Fork Reservoir, 45°51′26″N 112°44′55″W, el. 6,194 feet (1,888 m)
- South Side Reservoir, 45°08′13″N 112°31′59″W, el. 6,253 feet (1,906 m)
- Upper Reservoir, 45°50′22″N 112°31′32″W, el. 6,014 feet (1,833 m)
- Upper Reservoir, 45°50′36″N 112°31′27″W, el. 6,112 feet (1,863 m)
- West Side Reservoir, 46°01′26″N 112°33′08″W, el. 5,974 feet (1,821 m)

== See also ==
- List of lakes in Montana
