= List of lakes of Cascade County, Montana =

There are at least 15 named lakes and reservoirs in Cascade County, Montana.

== Lakes ==
- Benton Lake, 47°39′56″N 111°19′39″W, el. 3,625 feet (1,105 m), location of Benton Lake National Wildlife Refuge
- Black Horse Lake, 47°36′29″N 111°13′06″W, el. 3,415 feet (1,041 m)
- Cannon Lake, 46°59′33″N 111°38′52″W, el. 4,872 feet (1,485 m)
- Horseshoe Lake, 47°30′53″N 111°26′14″W, el. 3,320 feet (1,010 m)
- Schrammeck Lake, 47°14′20″N 111°32′03″W, el. 3,730 feet (1,140 m)

== Reservoirs ==
- Cascade Reservoir, 47°16′33″N 111°42′48″W, el. 3,570 feet (1,090 m)
- Dick Golie Fish Pond, 47°38′48″N 111°10′57″W, el. 3,517 feet (1,072 m)
- Elizabeth Reservoir, 47°22′24″N 111°42′02″W, el. 3,392 feet (1,034 m)
- Gollaher Reservoir, 47°13′19″N 111°37′14″W, el. 3,540 feet (1,080 m)
- Hound Creek Reservoir, 47°00′33″N 111°41′30″W, el. 5,082 feet (1,549 m)
- Middle Creek Lake, 46°56′21″N 111°40′47″W, el. 5,538 feet (1,688 m)
- Morony Reservoir, 47°34′54″N 111°03′39″W, el. 2,848 feet (868 m)
- Neihart Reservoir, 46°54′53″N 110°43′56″W, el. 5,912 feet (1,802 m)
- Rocky Reef Reservoir, 47°22′44″N 111°44′43″W, el. 3,409 feet (1,039 m)
- Spring Creek Reservoir, 47°01′26″N 111°40′13″W, el. 5,125 feet (1,562 m)

== See also ==
- List of lakes in Montana
