= List of lakes of Montana =

There are at least 3,223 named lakes and reservoirs in Montana. The following list contains lists of lakes and reservoirs in Montana by county.

A lake is a terrain feature (or physical feature), a body of liquid on the surface of a world that is localized to the bottom of basin (another type of landform or terrain feature; that is not global). Another definition is a body of fresh or salt water of considerable size that is surrounded by land. On Earth a body of water is considered a lake when it is inland, not part of the ocean, is larger and deeper than a pond.

A reservoir (etymology from French réservoir a "storehouse) is an artificial lake used to store water. Reservoirs may be created in river valleys by the construction of a dam or may be built by excavation in the ground or by conventional construction techniques such a brickwork or cast concrete. Swimming, fishing, and/or boating are permitted in some of these lakes, but not all.

== Lists of Montana lakes ==
- List of lakes of Beaverhead County, Montana
- List of lakes of Big Horn County, Montana
- List of lakes of Blaine County, Montana
- List of lakes of Broadwater County, Montana
- List of lakes of Carbon County, Montana
- List of lakes of Carter County, Montana
- List of lakes of Cascade County, Montana
- List of lakes of Chouteau County, Montana
- List of lakes of Custer County, Montana
- List of lakes of Daniels County, Montana
- List of lakes of Dawson County, Montana
- List of lakes of Deer Lodge County, Montana
- List of lakes of Fallon County, Montana
- List of lakes of Fergus County, Montana
- List of lakes of Flathead County, Montana (A–L)
- List of lakes of Flathead County, Montana (M–Z)
- List of lakes of Gallatin County, Montana
- List of lakes of Garfield County, Montana
- List of lakes of Glacier County, Montana
- List of lakes of Golden Valley County, Montana
- List of lakes of Granite County, Montana
- List of lakes of Hill County, Montana
- List of lakes of Jefferson County, Montana
- List of lakes of Judith Basin County, Montana
- List of lakes of Lake County, Montana
- List of lakes of Lewis and Clark County, Montana
- List of lakes of Liberty County, Montana
- List of lakes of Lincoln County, Montana
- List of lakes of Madison County, Montana
- List of lakes of McCone County, Montana
- List of lakes of Meagher County, Montana
- List of lakes of Mineral County, Montana
- List of lakes of Missoula County, Montana
- List of lakes of Musselshell County, Montana
- List of lakes of Park County, Montana
- List of lakes of Petroleum County, Montana
- List of lakes of Phillips County, Montana
- List of lakes of Pondera County, Montana
- List of lakes of Powder River County, Montana
- List of lakes of Powell County, Montana
- List of lakes of Prairie County, Montana
- List of lakes of Ravalli County, Montana
- List of lakes of Richland County, Montana
- List of lakes of Roosevelt County, Montana
- List of lakes of Rosebud County, Montana
- List of lakes of Sanders County, Montana
- List of lakes of Sheridan County, Montana
- List of lakes of Silver Bow County, Montana
- List of lakes of Stillwater County, Montana
- List of lakes of Sweet Grass County, Montana
- List of lakes of Teton County, Montana
- List of lakes of Toole County, Montana
- List of lakes of Treasure County, Montana
- List of lakes of Wheatland County, Montana
- List of lakes of Wibaux County, Montana
- List of lakes of Valley County, Montana (A–L)
- List of lakes of Valley County, Montana (M–Z)
- List of lakes of Yellowstone County, Montana
