= Wilson Lake =

Wilson Lake may refer to

== Canada ==
- Wilson Lake, a lake of Nova Scotia

== United States ==
- Wilson Lake (Alabama)
- Wilson Lake (Cleveland County, Arkansas), a lake of Cleveland County, Arkansas
- Wilson Lake (Columbia County, Arkansas), a lake of Columbia County, Arkansas
- Wilson Lake (Nevada County, Arkansas), a lake of Nevada County, Arkansas
- Wilson Lake (Pulaski County, Arkansas), a lake of Pulaski County, Arkansas
- Wilson Lake (Randolph County, Arkansas), a lake of Randolph County, Arkansas
- Wilson Lake (Kansas)
- Wilson Lake (Maine)
- Wilson Lake, part of the Elk River Chain of Lakes Watershed, Michigan
- Wilson Lake, a lake in Mineral County, Montana
- Wilson Lake (Wisconsin), seven lakes, including:
  - Wilson Lake (Iron County, Wisconsin)

== See also ==
- Lake Wilson (disambiguation)
