= Choctaw Lake =

Choctaw Lake may refer to:

- Choctaw Lake, Ohio
- Choctaw Lake (Mississippi)
- Choctaw Lake (Prairie County, Arkansas), see List of lakes in Prairie County, Arkansas
- Choctaw Lake (Van Buren County, Arkansas), see List of lakes in Van Buren County, Arkansas
