= List of lakes of White County, Arkansas =

There are at least 85 named lakes and reservoirs in White County, Arkansas.

== Lakes ==
- Arm Lake, 35°24′22″N 091°23′39″W, el. 194 feet (59 m)
- Bacon Lake, 35°19′15″N 091°26′32″W, el. 194 feet (59 m)
- Bailey Lake, 35°08′17″N 091°33′55″W, el. 184 feet (56 m)
- Ball Lake, 35°07′28″N 091°28′12″W, el. 187 feet (57 m)
- Barbers Lake, 35°09′20″N 091°31′19″W, el. 190 feet (58 m)
- Bear Water Slough, 35°23′04″N 091°25′25″W, el. 197 feet (60 m)
- Beaver Lake, 35°24′28″N 091°25′00″W, el. 200 feet (61 m)
- Beaver Pond, 35°14′08″N 091°30′44″W, el. 190 feet (58 m)
- Beaver Pond, 35°16′38″N 091°27′56″W, el. 190 feet (58 m)
- Big Bell Lake, 35°12′44″N 091°26′01″W, el. 187 feet (57 m)
- Big Brushy Lake, 35°15′13″N 091°26′11″W, el. 190 feet (58 m)
- Big Clear Lake, 35°16′43″N 091°27′01″W, el. 190 feet (58 m)
- Big Green Tom Lake, 35°17′02″N 091°25′33″W, el. 194 feet (59 m)
- Big Hurricane Lake, 35°14′11″N 091°26′40″W, el. 187 feet (57 m)
- Birch Pond, 35°15′15″N 091°35′27″W, el. 194 feet (59 m)
- Blue Hole Lake, 35°15′39″N 091°27′11″W, el. 190 feet (58 m)
- Bollie Pond, 35°15′50″N 091°28′18″W, el. 190 feet (58 m)
- Bradford Lake, 35°24′55″N 091°26′00″W, el. 200 feet (61 m)
- Britt Lake, 35°08′45″N 091°27′32″W, el. 184 feet (56 m)
- Brushy Lake, 35°23′57″N 091°25′32″W, el. 200 feet (61 m)
- Cheek Lake, 35°04′06″N 091°44′55″W, el. 194 feet (59 m)
- Cobb Lake, 35°04′41″N 091°50′57″W, el. 213 feet (65 m)
- Cunningham Pond, 35°14′01″N 091°29′58″W, el. 194 feet (59 m)
- Cypress Lake, 35°01′58″N 091°48′45″W, el. 194 feet (59 m)
- Diamond Pond, 35°06′49″N 091°32′06″W, el. 184 feet (56 m)
- Dollar Pond, 35°12′17″N 091°25′25″W, el. 184 feet (56 m)
- Doniphan Lake, 35°15′04″N 091°40′34″W, el. 207 feet (63 m)
- Goose Pond, 35°22′59″N 091°26′08″W, el. 194 feet (59 m)
- Grinnell Pond, 35°25′12″N 091°25′47″W, el. 200 feet (61 m)
- Gum Pond, 35°12′59″N 091°25′01″W, el. 190 feet (58 m)
- Hackelton Lake, 35°12′25″N 091°29′36″W, el. 187 feet (57 m)
- Hat Lake, 35°12′59″N 091°27′03″W, el. 190 feet (58 m)
- Honey Lake, 35°11′43″N 091°26′29″W, el. 184 feet (56 m)
- Hopspinike Lake, 35°24′55″N 091°23′42″W, el. 207 feet (63 m)
- Horseshoe Lake, 35°22′24″N 091°26′47″W, el. 194 feet (59 m)
- Jarvers Lake, 35°07′21″N 091°33′20″W, el. 184 feet (56 m)
- Kellum Slough, 35°09′19″N 091°27′55″W, el. 184 feet (56 m)
- Little Bell Lake, 35°13′05″N 091°25′35″W, el. 190 feet (58 m)
- Little Brushy Lake, 35°15′09″N 091°26′41″W, el. 190 feet (58 m)
- Little Clear Lake, 35°16′05″N 091°26′35″W, el. 190 feet (58 m)
- Little Green Tom Lake, 35°13′46″N 091°25′27″W, el. 190 feet (58 m)
- Little Green Tom Lake, 35°17′06″N 091°24′57″W, el. 194 feet (59 m)
- Little Hurricane Lake, 35°14′34″N 091°26′56″W, el. 187 feet (57 m)
- Little Lake, 35°23′35″N 091°26′51″W, el. 200 feet (61 m)
- Long Lake, 35°20′06″N 091°26′22″W, el. 187 feet (57 m)
- Mallard Pond, 35°11′58″N 091°28′19″W, el. 187 feet (57 m)
- McDougal Lake, 35°24′48″N 091°22′29″W, el. 194 feet (59 m)
- Mica Lake, 35°27′29″N 091°24′09″W, el. 200 feet (61 m)
- Milliken Lake, 35°10′12″N 091°34′42″W, el. 187 feet (57 m)
- Moon Lake, 35°15′40″N 091°25′16″W, el. 194 feet (59 m)
- Mud Pond, 35°12′08″N 091°27′44″W, el. 190 feet (58 m)
- Murphy Lake, 35°19′26″N 091°27′01″W, el. 187 feet (57 m)
- Newmann Lake, 35°09′59″N 091°28′14″W, el. 184 feet (56 m)
- Otter Pond, 35°21′37″N 091°47′03″W, el. 220 feet (67 m)
- Otto Lake, 35°25′45″N 091°22′19″W, el. 203 feet (62 m)
- Redman Lake, 35°07′31″N 091°30′25″W, el. 184 feet (56 m)
- Round Pond, 35°20′08″N 091°26′04″W, el. 187 feet (57 m)
- Ryan Lake, 35°08′47″N 091°26′50″W, el. 180 feet (55 m)
- Smith Pond, 35°13′23″N 091°45′37″W, el. 272 feet (83 m)
- Swan Ponds, 35°10′15″N 091°47′17″W, el. 220 feet (67 m)
- Three Sisters Lake, 35°13′42″N 091°28′27″W, el. 190 feet (58 m)
- Walker Lake, 35°19′38″N 091°27′02″W, el. 187 feet (57 m)
- Wheaton Lake, 35°06′28″N 091°30′12″W, el. 184 feet (56 m)
- Whirl Lake, 35°11′56″N 091°25′51″W, el. 180 feet (55 m)
- Willow Pond, 35°15′01″N 091°25′42″W, el. 190 feet (58 m)
- Wolf Lake, 35°13′43″N 091°24′25″W, el. 194 feet (59 m)

== Reservoirs ==
- Bridges Lake, 35°25′12″N 091°39′29″W, el. 344 feet (105 m)
- Buddy Lake, 35°24′48″N 091°36′06″W, el. 469 feet (143 m)
- Chavell Lake Two, 35°23′42″N 091°40′42″W, el. 499 feet (152 m)
- Hill Lake, 35°23′30″N 091°40′24″W, el. 440 feet (130 m)
- Jenkins Lake, 35°04′30″N 091°41′00″W, el. 194 feet (59 m)
- Kinley Lake, 35°04′50″N 091°51′27″W, el. 213 feet (65 m)
- Lake Bald Knob, 35°20′33″N 091°35′33″W, el. 243 feet (74 m)
- Lercher Lake Number One, 35°12′20″N 091°51′15″W, el. 466 feet (142 m)
- Lercher Lake Number Two, 35°11′31″N 091°53′12″W, el. 509 feet (155 m)
- Myers Lake, 35°16′31″N 091°57′28″W, el. 548 feet (167 m)
- Ranson Lake, 35°28′30″N 091°36′30″W, el. 558 feet (170 m)
- Schroeder Lake, 35°07′57″N 091°46′45″W, el. 207 feet (63 m)
- Smith Lake, 35°23′48″N 091°28′30″W, el. 223 feet (68 m)
- Smith Lake One, 35°24′49″N 091°28′44″W, el. 253 feet (77 m)
- Smith Lake Two, 35°23′11″N 091°28′18″W, el. 217 feet (66 m)
- Stewart's Reservoir, 35°03′50″N 091°44′16″W, el. 194 feet (59 m)
- Troutman Lake, 35°04′00″N 092°05′31″W, el. 249 feet (76 m)
- Wingert Reservoir, 35°20′42″N 092°05′49″W, el. 676 feet (206 m)
- Wyldewood Lake, 35°16′42″N 091°44′00″W, el. 387 feet (118 m)

== See also ==
- List of lakes in Arkansas
