= List of lakes of Craighead County, Arkansas =

There are at least 27 named lakes and reservoirs in Craighead County, Arkansas.

== Lakes ==
According to the United States Geological Survey, there are no named lakes in Craighead County.

== Reservoirs ==
- Big Creek Site Four Reservoir, 35°57′48″N 090°42′24″W, el. 407 feet (124 m)
- Big Creek Site Five Reservoir, 35°58′24″N 090°44′00″W, el. 413 feet (126 m)
- Big Creek Site Six Reservoir, 35°55′54″N 090°43′52″W, el. 367 feet (112 m)
- Big Creek Site Seven Reservoir, 35°55′02″N 090°44′01″W, el. 331 feet (101 m)
- Big Creek Site Eight Reservoir, 35°54′14″N 090°44′40″W, el. 338 feet (103 m)
- Big Creek Site Nine Reservoir, 35°53′12″N 090°44′30″W, el. 315 feet (96 m)
- Big Creek Site 10 Reservoir, 35°53′20″N 090°46′33″W, el. 328 feet (100 m)
- Big Creek Site 11 Reservoir, 35°52′12″N 090°47′18″W, el. 308 feet (94 m)
- Big Creek Site 13 Reservoir, 35°49′03″N 090°46′15″W, el. 308 feet (94 m)
- Big Creek Site 14 Reservoir, 35°49′24″N 090°45′12″W, el. 361 feet (110 m)
- Big Creek Site 15 Reservoir, 35°58′07″N 090°40′12″W, el. 371 feet (113 m)
- Big Creek Site 16 Reservoir, 35°58′00″N 090°39′00″W, el. 440 feet (130 m)
- Big Creek Site 17 Reservoir, 35°55′54″N 090°41′00″W, el. 364 feet (111 m)
- Big Creek Site 18 Reservoir, 35°55′24″N 090°39′00″W, el. 361 feet (110 m)
- Big Creek Site 19 Reservoir, 35°53′00″N 090°40′36″W, el. 328 feet (100 m)
- Big Creek Site 20 Reservoir, 35°53′00″N 090°41′54″W, el. 361 feet (110 m)
- Big Creek Site 21 Reservoir, 35°47′48″N 090°45′30″W, el. 364 feet (111 m)
- Big Creek Site 22 Reservoir, 35°47′48″N 090°45′36″W, el. 381 feet (116 m)
- Big Pond, 35°50′36″N 090°39′18″W, el. 331 feet (101 m)
- Cole Pond, 35°50′30″N 090°49′42″W, el. 302 feet (92 m)
- Craighead Forest Lake, 35°46′43″N 090°42′17″W, el. 354 feet (108 m)
- Farmers Lake, 35°44′14″N 090°47′59″W, el. 249 feet (76 m)
- Guy Parden Pond, 35°54′42″N 090°45′30″W, el. 410 feet (120 m)
- J L Craft Pond, 35°55′24″N 090°46′12″W, el. 390 feet (120 m)
- Mary Simpson Pond, 35°47′01″N 090°44′01″W, el. 325 feet (99 m)
- Poinsett Watershed Site 20 Reservoir, 35°47′18″N 090°41′18″W, el. 295 feet (90 m)
- Ralph Cox Pond, 35°52′54″N 090°46′42″W, el. 312 feet (95 m)

== See also ==
- List of lakes in Arkansas
