= List of lakes of Jackson County, Arkansas =

There are at least 45 named lakes and reservoirs in Jackson County, Arkansas.

== Lakes ==
- Doctor Jacksons Lake, 35°28′12″N 091°33′12″W, el. 430 feet (130 m)
- Masons Reservoir, 35°27′28″N 091°27′14″W, el. 236 feet (72 m)
- Parsley Reservoir, 35°44′06″N 091°06′44″W, el. 243 feet (74 m)

== Reservoirs ==
- Bear Lake, 35°28′08″N 091°18′40″W, el. 200 feet (61 m)
- Beaver Dam Lake, 35°27′01″N 091°18′47″W, el. 200 feet (61 m)
- Bell Lake, 35°44′02″N 091°18′48″W, el. 220 feet (67 m)
- Bergen Lake, 35°38′50″N 091°17′51″W, el. 213 feet (65 m)
- Big Horseshoe Lake, 35°28′46″N 091°16′57″W, el. 203 feet (62 m)
- Blanchard Lake, 35°38′10″N 091°04′11″W, el. 223 feet (68 m)
- Brewer Lake, 35°35′07″N 091°06′25″W, el. 220 feet (67 m)
- Bright Lake, 35°28′06″N 091°22′39″W, el. 207 feet (63 m)
- Brush Lake, 35°44′23″N 091°19′35″W, el. 217 feet (66 m)
- Buck Pond, 35°31′04″N 091°19′26″W, el. 200 feet (61 m)
- Campbell Lake, 35°39′39″N 091°14′13″W, el. 226 feet (69 m)
- Clear Lake, 35°32′00″N 091°15′05″W, el. 207 feet (63 m)
- Drummond Lake, 35°32′44″N 091°16′33″W, el. 210 feet (64 m)
- Duck Roost Slough, 35°29′13″N 091°19′10″W, el. 207 feet (63 m)
- Eagle Lake, 35°43′32″N 091°19′42″W, el. 210 feet (64 m)
- Eagle Lake, 35°32′48″N 091°19′06″W, el. 200 feet (61 m)
- Gamble Lake, 35°39′36″N 091°19′18″W, el. 213 feet (65 m)
- Goose Pond, 35°40′48″N 091°19′44″W, el. 213 feet (65 m)
- Grassy Lake, 35°31′07″N 091°18′07″W, el. 210 feet (64 m)
- Grindle Lake, 35°37′09″N 091°05′00″W, el. 220 feet (67 m)
- Guthrie Lake, 35°43′23″N 091°08′26″W, el. 233 feet (71 m)
- Hale Lake, 35°37′47″N 091°04′45″W, el. 220 feet (67 m)
- Hog Lake, 35°31′28″N 091°19′34″W, el. 200 feet (61 m)
- Horseshoe Lake, 35°43′59″N 091°19′28″W, el. 217 feet (66 m)
- Horseshoe Lake, 35°31′36″N 091°21′20″W, el. 203 feet (62 m)
- Howard Lake, 35°41′07″N 091°19′23″W, el. 217 feet (66 m)
- Johnson Lake, 35°41′07″N 091°02′53″W, el. 230 feet (70 m)
- Jonah Lake, 35°41′46″N 091°18′38″W, el. 220 feet (67 m)
- Layton Lake, 35°42′38″N 091°09′51″W, el. 233 feet (71 m)
- Little Horseshoe Lake, 35°28′36″N 091°16′24″W, el. 200 feet (61 m)
- Little Mott Lake, 35°40′01″N 091°14′02″W, el. 226 feet (69 m)
- Mott Lake, 35°40′23″N 091°13′56″W, el. 226 feet (69 m)
- Newport Lake, 35°36′29″N 091°16′36″W, el. 220 feet (67 m)
- Newton Lake, 35°30′55″N 091°16′40″W, el. 207 feet (63 m)
- Otter Lake, 35°42′08″N 091°20′45″W, el. 210 feet (64 m)
- Parrott Lake, 35°41′57″N 091°11′37″W, el. 230 feet (70 m)
- Pickett Lake, 35°29′05″N 091°15′50″W, el. 203 feet (62 m)
- Round Pond, 35°37′05″N 091°18′57″W, el. 203 feet (62 m)
- Spradlin Lake, 35°29′36″N 091°19′38″W, el. 207 feet (63 m)
- Steenbergen Lake, 35°28′40″N 091°23′48″W, el. 203 feet (62 m)
- Vance Lake, 35°33′26″N 091°17′09″W, el. 213 feet (65 m)
- Watson Lake, 35°32′31″N 091°15′48″W, el. 207 feet (63 m)

== See also ==
- List of lakes in Arkansas
