= List of lakes of Phillips County, Arkansas =

There are at least 35 named lakes and reservoirs in Phillips County, Arkansas.

== Lakes ==
- Allen Lake, 34°15′21″N 090°54′34″W, el. 157 feet (48 m)
- Beaver Pond, 34°37′03″N 090°37′16″W, el. 190 feet (58 m)
- Brushy Lake, 34°33′47″N 090°35′03″W, el. 174 feet (53 m)
- Cargo Slash, 34°27′31″N 090°58′37″W, el. 174 feet (53 m)
- Chaney Lake, 34°17′41″N 091°00′38″W, el. 144 feet (44 m)
- Chute of Island 68, 34°08′41″N 090°57′49″W, el. 148 feet (45 m)
- Cober Lake, 34°38′12″N 090°36′59″W, el. 180 feet (55 m)
- Dustin Pond, 34°19′25″N 090°40′43″W, el. 167 feet (51 m)
- Eagle Nest Lake, 34°19′47″N 091°01′13″W, el. 144 feet (44 m)
- Flag Lake, 34°16′23″N 090°54′59″W, el. 151 feet (46 m)
- Flat Lake, 34°13′32″N 091°03′27″W, el. 135 feet (41 m)
- Forked Lake, 34°38′02″N 090°36′46″W, el. 180 feet (55 m)
- Hornor Neck, 34°35′41″N 090°35′46″W, el. 174 feet (53 m)
- Horseshoe Lake, 34°10′07″N 091°04′48″W, el. 138 feet (42 m)
- Jentry Lake, 34°37′55″N 090°37′04″W, el. 180 feet (55 m)
- Lacy Lake, 34°37′55″N 090°37′04″W, el. 180 feet (55 m)
- Lake Bayou, 34°12′03″N 091°03′18″W, el. 141 feet (43 m)
- Little Cypress Lake, 34°07′13″N 091°06′28″W, el. 144 feet (44 m)
- Long Lake, 34°28′34″N 090°36′08″W, el. 180 feet (55 m)
- Long Lake, 34°29′00″N 090°38′09″W, el. 171 feet (52 m)
- Long Lake, 34°29′15″N 090°36′44″W, el. 171 feet (52 m)
- Lost Lakes, 34°15′39″N 091°02′14″W, el. 144 feet (44 m)
- Lower Taylor Lake, 34°07′28″N 091°04′31″W, el. 144 feet (44 m)
- Old Town Lake, 34°24′35″N 090°46′15″W, el. 164 feet (50 m)
- Porter Lake, 34°34′59″N 090°35′20″W, el. 174 feet (53 m)
- Round Lake, 34°16′19″N 091°04′03″W, el. 141 feet (43 m)
- Steelman Lake, 34°07′39″N 091°05′26″W, el. 141 feet (43 m)
- Swan Lake, 34°19′15″N 090°49′32″W, el. 154 feet (47 m)
- Tupelo Lake, 34°09′44″N 091°04′34″W, el. 144 feet (44 m)
- Upper Taylor Lake, 34°08′42″N 091°03′47″W, el. 141 feet (43 m)
- Willow Lake, 34°09′29″N 091°03′52″W, el. 141 feet (43 m)
- Willow Lake, 34°19′39″N 091°02′16″W, el. 144 feet (44 m)

== Reservoirs ==
- Heritage Hill Pond, 34°30′48″N 090°37′24″W, el. 236 feet (72 m)
- Jake Lake, 34°37′53″N 090°39′51″W, el. 292 feet (89 m)
- Storm Creek Lake, 34°35′54″N 090°37′18″W, el. 223 feet (68 m)

== See also ==
- List of lakes in Arkansas
