= List of lakes of Dallas County, Arkansas =

There are at least 7 named lakes and reservoirs in Dallas County, Arkansas.

== Lakes ==
- Shell Lake, 33°49′23″N 092°51′3″W, el. 121 feet (37 m)
- Long Lake, 33°53′31″N 092°53′1″W, el. 131 feet (40 m)
- Round Lake, 33°52′49″N 092°52′9″W, el. 138 feet (42 m)
- Horseshoe Lake, 33°48′39″N 092°53′9″W, el. 118 feet (36 m)

== Reservoirs ==
- Lake Lansdale, 35°47′57″N 092°27′43″W, el. 299 feet (91 m)
- Jacobs Lake, 33°50′54″N 092°28′48″W, el. 285 feet (87 m)
- Kervin Lake Number One, 33°51′31″N 092°26′00″W, el. 262 feet (80 m)

== See also ==
- List of lakes in Arkansas
