= List of lakes of Montgomery County, Arkansas =

There are at least 5 named lakes and reservoirs in Montgomery County, Arkansas.

== Lakes ==
According to the United States Geological Survey, there are no named lakes in Montgomery County, Arkansas.

== Reservoirs ==
- Hatfield Lake, 34°34′54″N 093°54′07″W, el. 840 feet (260 m)
- Lake Ouachita, 34°36′23″N 093°20′52″W, el. 577 feet (176 m)
- Lake Ouachita Nursery Pond, 34°35′15″N 093°28′06″W, el. 587 feet (179 m)
- North Fork Lake, 34°32′27″N 093°47′58″W, el. 928 feet (283 m)
- Tigue Lake, 34°21′54″N 093°35′13″W, el. 643 feet (196 m)

== See also ==
- List of lakes in Arkansas
