= List of lakes of Lafayette County, Arkansas =

There are at least 23 named lakes and reservoirs in Lafayette County, Arkansas.

== Lakes ==
- 1927 Cut-off Lake, 33°27′39″N 093°42′38″W, el. 233 feet (71 m)
- Battle Lake, 33°18′28″N 093°39′43″W, el. 217 feet (66 m)
- Blue Hole, 33°05′43″N 093°50′42″W, el. 200 feet (61 m)
- Cargill Pond, 33°20′21″N 093°37′38″W, el. 249 feet (76 m)
- Copeland Lake, 33°14′26″N 093°42′09″W, el. 203 feet (62 m)
- Duck Lake, 33°20′41″N 093°39′10″W, el. 217 feet (66 m)
- Grassy Lake, 33°26′35″N 093°41′33″W, el. 230 feet (70 m)
- Mays Lake, 33°24′54″N 093°41′59″W, el. 226 feet (69 m)
- Mays Lake, 33°16′49″N 093°39′39″W, el. 223 feet (68 m)
- Spirit Lake, 33°21′14″N 093°39′59″W, el. 220 feet (67 m)
- Swan Lake, 33°15′05″N 093°40′32″W, el. 213 feet (65 m)

== Reservoirs ==
- Barmes Pond, 33°22′40″N 093°35′02″W, el. 305 feet (93 m)
- Buehler Herndon Lake Number Two, 33°24′24″N 093°35′44″W, el. 305 feet (93 m)
- Buehler Herndon Number One Reservoir, 33°23′48″N 093°35′49″W, el. 289 feet (88 m)
- Enyart Lake, 33°02′33″N 093°44′00″W, el. 197 feet (60 m)
- Lake Erling, 33°05′38″N 093°32′35″W, el. 217 feet (66 m)
- Lake June, 33°21′18″N 093°29′31″W, el. 259 feet (79 m)
- Lower Lake Jew Jon, 33°09′11″N 093°41′51″W, el. 236 feet (72 m)
- Meriwether Pond, 33°23′34″N 093°33′56″W, el. 295 feet (90 m)
- Moore Lake, 33°22′54″N 093°38′31″W, el. 226 feet (69 m)
- New Meriwether Pond, 33°23′56″N 093°35′46″W, el. 285 feet (87 m)
- Strange Lake, 33°20′00″N 093°29′49″W, el. 299 feet (91 m)
- Upper Jew-Jon Lake, 33°09′10″N 093°42′16″W, el. 256 feet (78 m)

== See also ==
- List of lakes in Arkansas
