= List of lakes of Marion County, Arkansas =

There are at least 2 named lakes and reservoirs in Marion County, Arkansas.

== Lakes ==
- Waltman Pond, 36°20′35″N 092°46′54″W, el. 1,191 feet (363 m)

== Reservoirs ==
- Bull Shoals Lake, 36°28′02″N 092°48′33″W, el. 653 feet (199 m)

== See also ==
- List of lakes in Arkansas
