= List of lakes of Yell County, Arkansas =

There are at least 26 named lakes and reservoirs in Yell County, Arkansas.

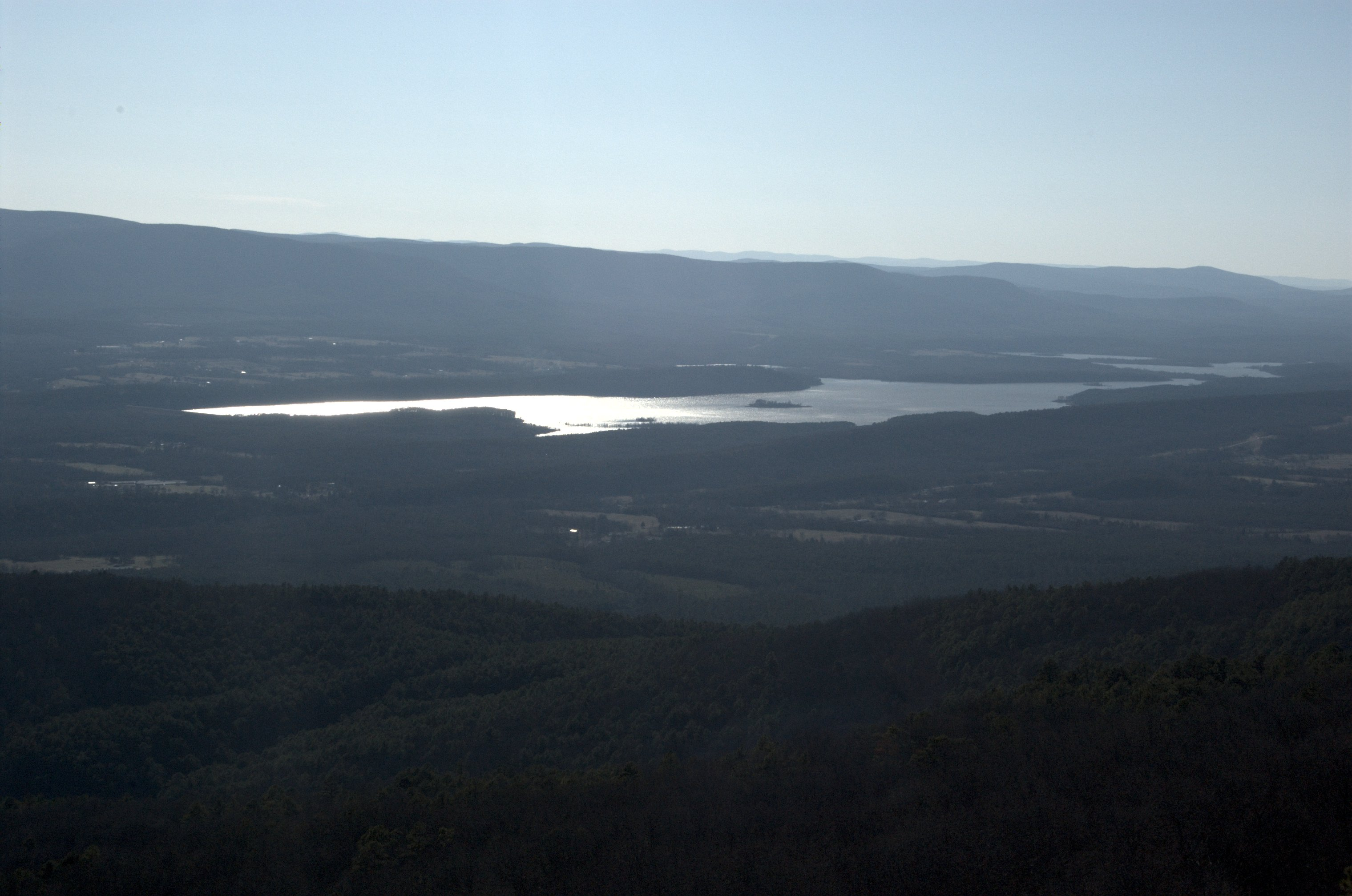
Blue Mountain Lake

== Lakes ==
- Buckman Lake, 35°04′33″N 093°28′14″W, el. 338 feet (103 m)
- Cowger Lake, 35°03′09″N 093°24′36″W, el. 325 feet (99 m)
- Gibson Lake, 35°07′48″N 093°07′34″W, el. 295 feet (90 m)
- Horseshoe Lake, 35°03′38″N 093°27′04″W, el. 325 feet (99 m)
- Keeland Lake, 35°02′48″N 093°12′15″W, el. 292 feet (89 m)
- Luther Lake, 35°07′51″N 093°05′28″W, el. 285 feet (87 m)
- Mason Lake, 35°03′56″N 093°27′23″W, el. 325 feet (99 m)
- Open Slough, 35°08′50″N 093°07′15″W, el. 302 feet (92 m)
- Peeler Lake, 35°04′09″N 093°19′51″W, el. 312 feet (95 m)
- Peter George Lake, 35°06′14″N 093°18′14″W, el. 322 feet (98 m)
- Rose Lake, 35°03′45″N 093°05′12″W, el. 299 feet (91 m)
- Surrounded Ridges Lake, 35°05′20″N 093°18′21″W, el. 308 feet (94 m)

== Reservoirs ==
- Bailey Branch Lake, 35°02′12″N 093°26′57″W, el. 344 feet (105 m)
- Blue Mountain Lake, 35°05′59″N 093°42′02″W, el. 384 feet (117 m)
- Bogs Lake, 35°08′01″N 093°17′47″W, el. 338 feet (103 m)
- Cedar-Piney Lake, 35°06′50″N 093°29′11″W, el. 387 feet (118 m)
- Chambers Lake, 35°02′37″N 093°27′49″W, el. 427 feet (130 m)
- Harris Fish Farm Reservoir, 35°06′07″N 093°21′22″W, el. 351 feet (107 m)
- Kingfisher Lake, 35°05′44″N 093°06′20″W, el. 315 feet (96 m)
- Lake Ola, 35°01′54″N 092°14′01″W, el. 361 feet (110 m)
- Lake Ola-dale, 35°01′48″N 093°14′10″W, el. 390 feet (120 m)
- Mockingbird Hill Lake, 35°06′27″N 093°13′05″W, el. 354 feet (108 m)
- Nimrod Lake, 34°57′03″N 093°14′37″W, el. 341 feet (104 m)
- Pullen Pond, 35°05′12″N 093°08′06″W, el. 302 feet (92 m)
- Schoonover Lake, 35°05′15″N 093°12′12″W, el. 348 feet (106 m)
- Spring Lake, 35°09′14″N 093°25′39″W, el. 512 feet (156 m)

== See also ==
- List of lakes in Arkansas
