= List of lakes of Scott County, Arkansas =

There are at least 21 named lakes and reservoirs in Scott County, Arkansas.

== Lakes ==
- Beaver Slough, 34°48′19″N 093°50′02″W, el. 531 feet (162 m)

== Reservoirs ==
- Giles Pond, 34°52′15″N 094°08′12″W, el. 673 feet (205 m)
- Lake Hinkle, 34°51′06″N 094°15′13″W, el. 886 feet (270 m)
- Lake Waldron, 34°57′50″N 094°06′09″W, el. 715 feet (218 m)
- Moore Lake, 34°55′28″N 093°57′02″W, el. 873 feet (266 m)
- Moore Lake, 34°55′31″N 093°56′57″W, el. 869 feet (265 m)
- Poteau River Site 11 Dam, 34°50′51″N 094°19′04″W, el. 807 feet (246 m)
- Poteau River Site 13 Lake, 34°51′33″N 094°16′20″W, el. 787 feet (240 m)
- Poteau River Site 14 Lake, 34°51′12″N 094°14′13″W, el. 758 feet (231 m)
- Poteau River Site 17 Lake, 34°51′49″N 094°10′54″W, el. 712 feet (217 m)
- Poteau River Site 18 Lake, 34°49′59″N 094°07′57″W, el. 764 feet (233 m)
- Poteau River Site Five Lake, 34°56′12″N 094°02′55″W, el. 699 feet (213 m)
- Poteau River Site Nine Lake, 34°55′53″N 094°19′48″W, el. 689 feet (210 m)
- Poteau River Site One Lake, 34°54′26″N 093°57′42″W, el. 853 feet (260 m)
- Poteau River Site Seven Lake, 34°57′00″N 094°10′01″W, el. 696 feet (212 m)
- Poteau River Watershed Site 12 Reservoir, 34°50′54″N 094°16′49″W, el. 791 feet (241 m)
- Poteau River Watershed Site 16 Lake, 34°54′43″N 094°14′27″W, el. 653 feet (199 m)
- Poteau River Watershed Site Eight Lake, 34°56′55″N 094°11′48″W, el. 682 feet (208 m)
- Selkirk Lake, 34°54′26″N 093°57′42″W, el. 853 feet (260 m)
- Truman Baker Lake, 34°52′22″N 094°04′32″W, el. 761 feet (232 m)
- Waldron Lake, 34°56′14″N 094°02′53″W, el. 705 feet (215 m)

== See also ==
- List of lakes in Arkansas
