= List of lakes of Polk County, Arkansas =

There are at least 23 named lakes and reservoirs in Polk County, Arkansas.

== Lakes ==
- Shady Lake, 34°21′42″N 094°01′41″W, el. 1,106 feet (337 m)

== Reservoirs ==
- Aeration Lake, 34°14′00″N 094°20′13″W, el. 906 feet (276 m)
- Bethesda Lake, 34°31′55″N 094°14′22″W, el. 1,207 feet (368 m)
- Polk County, 34°32′54″N 094°17′37″W, el. 1,014 feet (309 m)
- Brewer Lake, 34°17′48″N 094°19′07″W, el. 942 feet (287 m)
- City of Mena Sewage Logoon, 34°33′43″N 094°11′02″W, el. 1,014 feet (309 m)
- Cox Lake, 34°34′16″N 094°14′34″W, el. 1,109 feet (338 m)
- Dairy Lake, 34°35′30″N 094°05′56″W, el. 919 feet (280 m)
- Faulkner Lake, 34°34′49″N 093°59′31″W, el. 866 feet (264 m)
- Forbis Lake, 34°36′00″N 094°06′03″W, el. 951 feet (290 m)
- Hillcrest Lake, 34°36′12″N 094°12′07″W, el. 1,063 feet (324 m)
- Irons Fork Reservoir, 34°38′52″N 094°07′18″W, el. 1,083 feet (330 m)
- Ivey Lake, 34°34′30″N 094°24′01″W, el. 958 feet (292 m)
- J and B Lake, 34°33′47″N 094°01′21″W, el. 856 feet (261 m)
- Jenkins Lake, 34°19′36″N 094°22′19″W, el. 1,037 feet (316 m)
- Lake Wilhelmina, 34°36′16″N 094°21′19″W, el. 997 feet (304 m)
- Mena Lake, 34°35′00″N 094°11′54″W, el. 1,020 feet (310 m)
- Multipurpose Site One Reservoir, 34°38′52″N 094°07′18″W, el. 1,083 feet (330 m)
- Patchett Lake, 34°31′46″N 094°09′15″W, el. 1,037 feet (316 m)
- Powell Lake, 34°31′54″N 094°09′53″W, el. 1,030 feet (310 m)
- Reeds Lake, 34°37′42″N 094°27′15″W, el. 1,099 feet (335 m)
- Shady Lake, 34°21′30″N 094°01′43″W, el. 1,093 feet (333 m)
- Ward Lake, 34°36′28″N 094°14′48″W, el. 1,411 feet (430 m)

== See also ==
- List of lakes in Arkansas
