= List of lakes of Clark County, Arkansas =

There are at least 15 named lakes and reservoirs in Clark County, Arkansas.

== Lakes ==
- Barton Lake, 33°47′12″N 092°59′53″W, el. 135 feet (41 m)
- Deceiper Lake, 34°01′48″N 093°01′47″W, el. 171 feet (52 m)
- Horn Lake, 33°48′01″N 093°03′29″W, el. 148 feet (45 m)
- Nowlin Pond, 34°06′49″N 093°02′51″W, el. 174 feet (53 m)
- Salt Lake, 33°47′44″N 093°00′26″W, el. 135 feet (41 m)

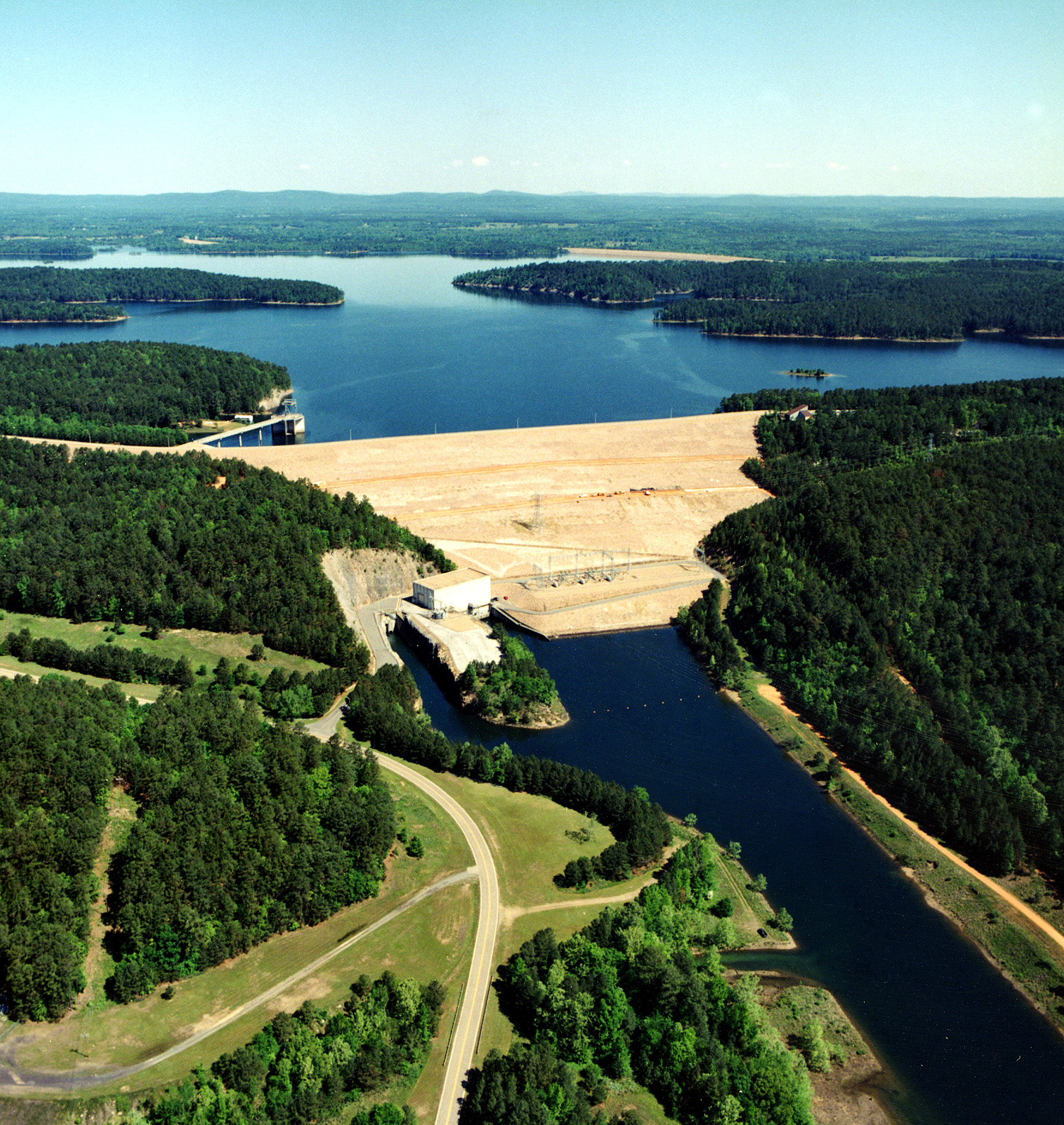
DeGray Lake Resort State Park is the center of recreation on DeGray Lake.

== Reservoirs ==
- Boswell Lake, 34°02′42″N 093°17′03″W, el. 253 feet (77 m)
- Country Club Lake, 34°08′54″N 093°05′20″W, el. 246 feet (75 m)
- De Gray Lake, 34°15′07″N 093°11′57″W, el. 400 feet (120 m)
- Degray Reregulating Lake, 34°10′42″N 093°06′01″W, el. 213 feet (65 m)
- Dwiggins Lake, 34°14′01″N 093°25′07″W, el. 489 feet (149 m)
- Gross Lake, 34°38′54″N 093°05′31″W, el. 771 feet (235 m)
- Gurdon Pond One, 33°54′44″N 093°10′15″W, el. 220 feet (67 m)
- Gurdon Pond Two, 33°54′18″N 093°09′55″W, el. 217 feet (66 m)
- Kirksey Reservoir, 34°15′12″N 093°26′25″W, el. 505 feet (154 m)
- Lake Barksdale, 34°14′05″N 093°22′00″W, el. 561 feet (171 m)

== See also ==
- List of lakes in Arkansas
