= List of lakes of Little River County, Arkansas =

There are at least 39 named lakes and reservoirs in Little River County, Arkansas.

== Lakes ==
- Applewhite Cut-off Lake, 33°32′39″N 094°21′16″W, el. 295 feet (90 m)
- Bear Lake, 33°35′04″N 093°57′30″W, el. 259 feet (79 m)
- Boggy Slough, 33°48′23″N 094°16′09″W, el. 269 feet (82 m)
- Choctaw Bayou, 33°36′41″N 094°24′40″W, el. 299 feet (91 m)
- Cut-off Lake, 33°35′25″N 093°54′52″W, el. 246 feet (75 m)
- Cut-off Lake, 33°35′08″N 094°05′46″W, el. 269 feet (82 m)
- Dunn Lake, 33°36′25″N 094°16′50″W, el. 285 feet (87 m)
- First Lake, 33°34′29″N 094°02′23″W, el. 262 feet (80 m)
- Grassy Lake, 33°36′04″N 094°05′22″W, el. 272 feet (83 m)
- Grassy Lake, 33°47′03″N 094°06′18″W, el. 259 feet (79 m)
- Hamilton Lake, 33°39′25″N 094°26′47″W, el. 308 feet (94 m)
- Hudson Lake, 33°33′45″N 094°22′24″W, el. 299 feet (91 m)
- Hurricane Bend Lake, 33°36′02″N 094°28′07″W, el. 305 feet (93 m)
- LaVoice Lake, 33°34′44″N 094°20′12″W, el. 285 feet (87 m)
- Mill Lake, 33°35′01″N 094°03′36″W, el. 269 feet (82 m)
- Muddy Lake, 33°34′16″N 093°59′35″W, el. 266 feet (81 m)
- Old River Lake, 33°38′35″N 094°27′01″W, el. 312 feet (95 m)
- Old River Lake, 33°36′08″N 094°09′54″W, el. 269 feet (82 m)
- Old River Lake, 33°35′54″N 093°53′07″W, el. 256 feet (78 m)
- Pleasant Lake, 33°33′46″N 094°02′51″W, el. 266 feet (81 m)
- Red Lake, 33°35′07″N 094°04′25″W, el. 262 feet (80 m)
- Red Lake, 33°49′00″N 094°16′37″W, el. 269 feet (82 m)
- Roseborough Lake, 33°33′21″N 094°11′45″W, el. 279 feet (85 m)
- Scott Lake, 33°36′11″N 094°08′56″W, el. 285 feet (87 m)
- Trailer Lake, 33°35′36″N 094°07′43″W, el. 276 feet (84 m)
- Trout Lake, 33°46′25″N 094°06′12″W, el. 259 feet (79 m)
- Young Lake, 33°35′19″N 093°55′12″W, el. 249 feet (76 m)

== Reservoirs ==
- Country Club Lake, 33°42′46″N 094°00′35″W, el. 279 feet (85 m)
- Dunbar Lake, 33°40′30″N 094°23′13″W, el. 374 feet (114 m)
- Haney Creek Watershed Site Two Reservoir, 33°38′06″N 094°08′25″W, el. 289 feet (88 m)
- Harris Lake, 33°38′07″N 094°05′24″W, el. 315 feet (96 m)
- M C Jones Lake Number One, 33°40′24″N 094°24′49″W, el. 328 feet (100 m)
- Millwood Lake, 33°41′45″N 093°57′41″W, el. 259 feet (79 m)
- Nacoosa Paper Retention Pond, 33°37′34″N 094°06′28″W, el. 315 feet (96 m)
- Pullen Lake, 33°40′48″N 094°16′09″W, el. 331 feet (101 m)
- Pyron Lake, 33°43′55″N 094°24′19″W, el. 449 feet (137 m)
- SW Arkansas W D Holding Basin, 33°38′38″N 094°05′55″W, el. 315 feet (96 m)
- Sivley Lake, 33°40′54″N 094°16′55″W, el. 341 feet (104 m)
- Two Reservoir, 33°40′30″N 094°24′49″W, el. 328 feet (100 m)

== See also ==
- List of lakes in Arkansas
