= List of lakes of Carroll County, Arkansas =

There are at least 10 named lakes and reservoirs in Carroll County, Arkansas.

== Lakes ==
According to the United States Geological Survey, there are no named lakes in Carroll County, Arkansas.

== Reservoirs ==
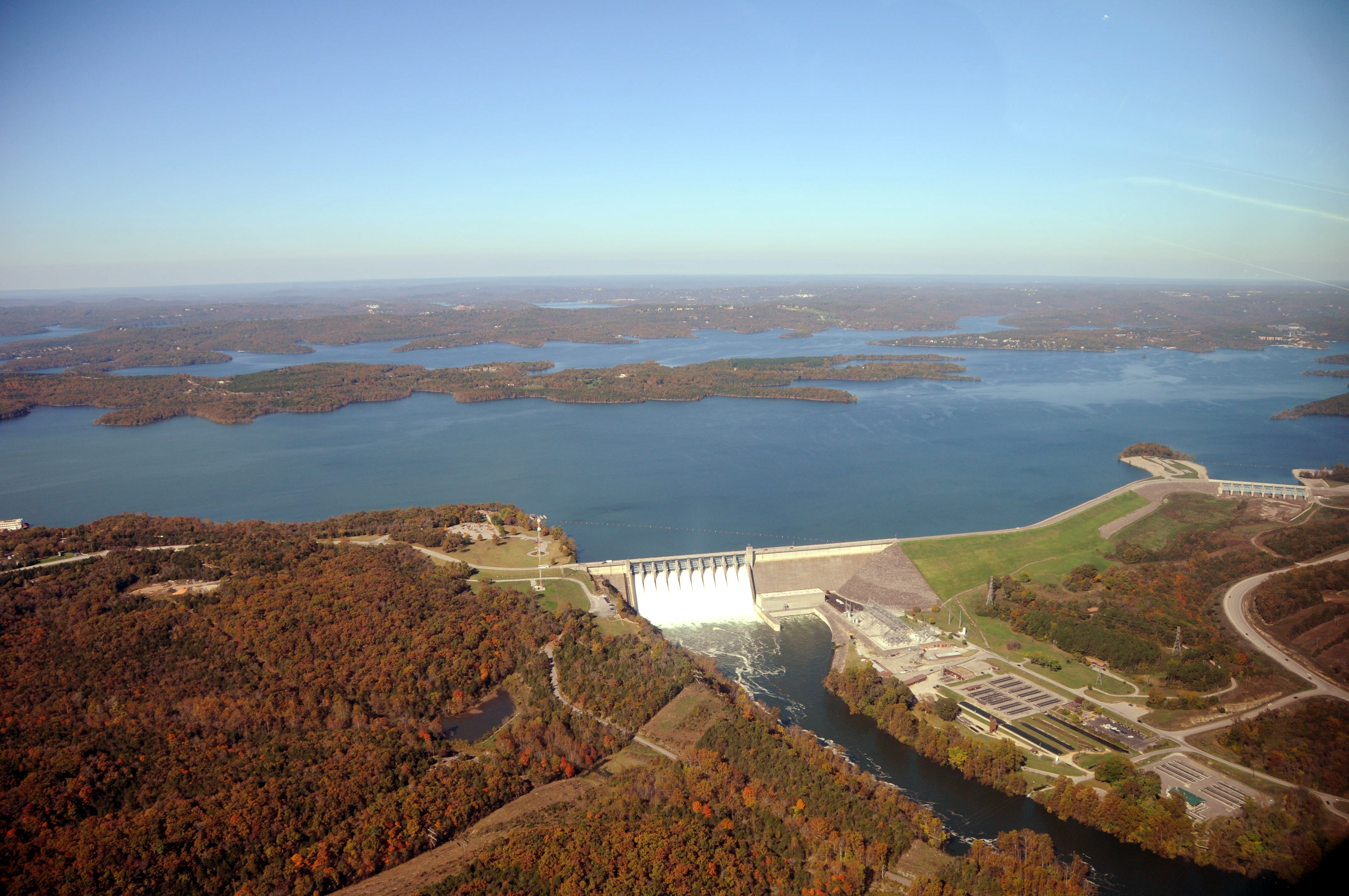
Although Table Rock Dam is actually in Missouri, Table Rock Lake extends into three Arkansas counties as well, including Carroll County.

- Beaver Lake, 36°14′08″N 093°56′34″W, el. 1,122 feet (342 m)
- Brewer Lake, 36°09′06″N 093°19′43″W, el. 2,116 feet (645 m)
- Eureka Springs City Lake, 36°23′34″N 093°44′49″W, el. 1,227 feet (374 m)
- Farwell Spider Creek Lake, 36°26′25″N 093°50′48″W, el. 955 feet (291 m)
- Fuller Lake, 36°26′21″N 093°35′37″W, el. 974 feet (297 m)
- Jackson Lake, 36°17′36″N 093°30′49″W, el. 1,283 feet (391 m)
- Lake Lucerene, 36°22′24″N 093°42′31″W, el. 1,411 feet (430 m)
- Lake of No Return, 36°11′24″N 093°22′31″W, el. 1,565 feet (477 m)
- Leatherwood Lake, 36°26′42″N 093°45′01″W, el. 1,030 feet (310 m)
- Table Rock Lake, 36°35′44″N 093°18′39″W, el. 791 feet (241 m)

== See also ==
- List of lakes in Arkansas
