= List of lakes of Lawrence County, Arkansas =

There are at least 34 named lakes and reservoirs in Lawrence County, Arkansas.

== Lakes ==
- Brushy Lake, 35°57′09″N 091°11′29″W, el. 233 feet (71 m)
- Brushy Pond, 36°00′21″N 091°11′44″W, el. 243 feet (74 m)
- Clear Lake, 36°06′54″N 091°02′53″W, el. 246 feet (75 m)
- Eagle Pond, 35°57′08″N 091°13′05″W, el. 236 feet (72 m)
- Fish Pond, 36°00′54″N 091°11′01″W, el. 239 feet (73 m)
- Horner Bay, 36°02′44″N 091°05′37″W, el. 239 feet (73 m)
- Horseshoe Lake, 36°08′41″N 091°03′21″W, el. 249 feet (76 m)
- Horseshoe Lake, 35°57′25″N 091°12′28″W, el. 233 feet (71 m)
- Long Pond, 36°01′21″N 091°10′24″W, el. 239 feet (73 m)
- Portia Bay, 36°04′43″N 091°05′23″W, el. 239 feet (73 m)
- Rainey Brake, 35°58′19″N 091°12′14″W, el. 236 feet (72 m)
- Robinson Bay, 36°00′53″N 091°08′22″W, el. 233 feet (71 m)
- Round Pong, 35°59′01″N 091°09′04″W, el. 233 feet (71 m)
- Sawlog Slough, 36°00′19″N 091°10′54″W, el. 239 feet (73 m)
- Swan Pond, 36°04′03″N 091°06′12″W, el. 249 feet (76 m)
- White Pond, 36°00′23″N 091°09′00″W, el. 236 feet (72 m)

== Reservoirs ==
- Byrd Lakes, 36°03′05″N 090°55′20″W, el. 266 feet (81 m)
- Cooper Creek Site Five Reservoir, 36°03′18″N 091°17′24″W, el. 348 feet (106 m)
- Cooper Creek Site Four Reservoir, 36°05′12″N 091°18′00″W, el. 361 feet (110 m)
- Cooper Creek Site One Reservoir, 36°06′24″N 091°18′12″W, el. 371 feet (113 m)
- Cooper Creek Site Six Reservoir, 36°02′20″N 091°17′12″W, el. 305 feet (93 m)
- Cooper Creek Site Three Reservoir, 36°07′24″N 091°17′30″W, el. 420 feet (130 m)
- Cooper Creek Site Two Reservoir, 36°08′06″N 091°17′48″W, el. 538 feet (164 m)
- Digman Lake, 36°02′45″N 090°54′50″W, el. 266 feet (81 m)
- Doctor Ralph Joseph Lake, 36°07′56″N 091°09′41″W, el. 315 feet (96 m)
- Flat Creek Site Five Reservoir, 36°02′35″N 091°10′21″W, el. 262 feet (80 m)
- Flat Creek Site Four Reservoir, 36°03′22″N 091°09′18″W, el. 253 feet (77 m)
- Flat Creek Site Six Reservoir, 36°01′49″N 091°11′04″W, el. 256 feet (78 m)
- Flat Creek Site Two Reservoir, 36°05′36″N 091°13′42″W, el. 387 feet (118 m)
- Lake Charles, 36°04′24″N 091°08′54″W, el. 272 feet (83 m)
- Little Joe Lake, 36°10′54″N 091°15′32″W, el. 591 feet (180 m)
- Phillips Lake, 36°06′45″N 091°13′28″W, el. 390 feet (120 m)
- Rainwater Lake, 36°02′06″N 090°54′16″W, el. 266 feet (81 m)
- Ralph McDonald Lake, 36°05′48″N 091°11′37″W, el. 338 feet (103 m)

== See also ==
- List of lakes in Arkansas
