= List of lakes of Poinsett County, Arkansas =

There are at least 20 named lakes and reservoirs in Poinsett County, Arkansas.

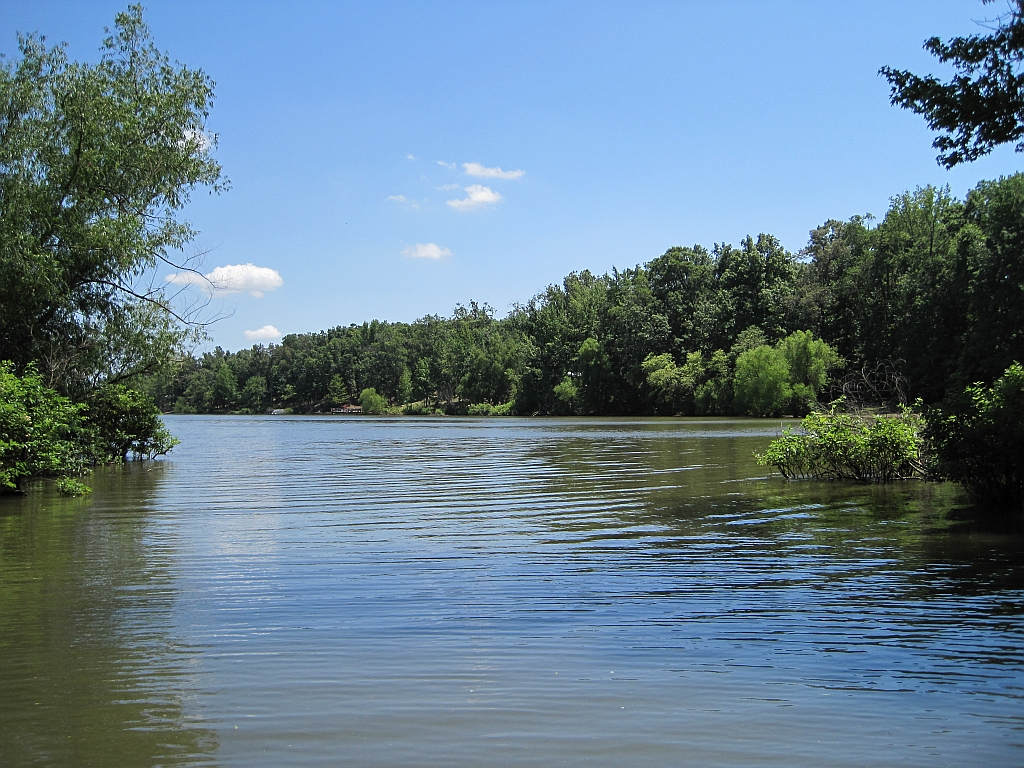
Lake Poinsett

== Lakes ==
- Dead Timber Lake, 35°26′34″N 090°17′32″W, el. 213 feet (65 m)
- Hood Lake, 35°42′01″N 090°55′06″W, el. 233 feet (71 m)
- Lost Trap Lake, 35°27′50″N 090°26′14″W, el. 213 feet (65 m)
- Snake Slough, 35°31′36″N 091°00′11″W, el. 223 feet (68 m)
- Spear Lake, 35°33′27″N 090°17′41″W, el. 207 feet (63 m)

== Reservoirs ==
- Chase Reservoir, 35°39′08″N 090°50′50″W, el. 246 feet (75 m)
- Claypool Reservoir, 35°36′52″N 090°47′17″W, el. 246 feet (75 m)
- John Kocher Lake, 35°33′42″N 090°47′18″W, el. 239 feet (73 m)
- Keller Lake, 35°42′07″N 090°47′14″W, el. 249 feet (76 m)
- Lake Hogue, 35°35′00″N 090°57′47″W, el. 230 feet (70 m)
- Lake Poinsett, 35°31′52″N 090°40′33″W, el. 302 feet (92 m)
- Lonnie Jaynes Lake, 35°38′06″N 090°39′06″W, el. 262 feet (80 m)
- O K Lake, 35°41′00″N 090°56′35″W, el. 233 feet (71 m)
- Paul Senteny Lake, 35°33′36″N 090°41′36″W, el. 407 feet (124 m)
- Poinsett Watershed Site 101 Reservoir, 35°28′18″N 090°41′18″W, el. 266 feet (81 m)
- Poinsett Watershed Site 102 Reservoir, 35°29′53″N 090°41′09″W, el. 289 feet (88 m)
- Poinsett Watershed Site One Reservoir, 35°28′30″N 090°40′54″W, el. 282 feet (86 m)
- Poinsett Watershed Site Three Reservoir, 35°30′12″N 090°41′00″W, el. 269 feet (82 m)
- Poinsett Watershed Site Two Reservoir, 35°29′25″N 090°41′10″W, el. 285 feet (87 m)
- Wayne Carter Lake, 35°32′42″N 090°43′06″W, el. 335 feet (102 m)

== See also ==
- List of lakes in Arkansas
