= List of lakes of Perry County, Arkansas =

There are at least 28 named lakes and reservoirs in Perry County, Arkansas.

== Lakes ==
- Bull Lake, 34°57′47″N 092°51′55″W, el. 279 feet (85 m)
- Bull Lake Slough, 34°58′33″N 092°50′55″W, el. 272 feet (83 m)
- Clear Lake, 34°58′14″N 092°50′36″W, el. 269 feet (82 m)
- Open Lake, 34°58′24″N 092°42′58″W, el. 276 feet (84 m)
- Winford Brake, 34°59′36″N 092°41′05″W, el. 259 feet (79 m)

== Reservoirs ==
- Big Fish Pond, 34°58′06″N 092°57′31″W, el. 318 feet (97 m)
- Clear Water Lake, 35°02′28″N 092°57′54″W, el. 486 feet (148 m)
- Cove Creek Lake, 34°54′55″N 093°04′10″W, el. 384 feet (117 m)
- Darby's Pond, 34°58′35″N 092°49′04″W, el. 289 feet (88 m)
- Deltic Farms Lake, 34°53′23″N 092°46′17″W, el. 449 feet (137 m)
- Francis Lake, 34°58′37″N 092°39′02″W, el. 266 feet (81 m)
- Harris Brake, 34°58′35″N 092°46′16″W, el. 282 feet (86 m)
- Harris Brake Public Fishing Lake, 34°59′12″N 092°46′31″W, el. 279 feet (85 m)
- Henry Lake, 34°55′21″N 092°48′22″W, el. 669 feet (204 m)
- Jones Lake Number Two, 35°05′22″N 092°33′38″W, el. 285 feet (87 m)
- Lake Sylvia, 34°52′09″N 092°49′20″W, el. 633 feet (193 m)
- Ouachita Creek Watershed Site One Reservoir, 35°02′28″N 092°34′19″W, el. 285 feet (87 m)
- Ouachita Creek Watershed Site Three Reservoir, 35°04′06″N 092°34′03″W, el. 279 feet (85 m)
- Ouachita Creek Watershed Site Two Reservoir, 35°03′06″N 092°33′55″W, el. 282 feet (86 m)
- Owens Lake, 35°05′42″N 093°33′37″W, el. 348 feet (106 m)
- Rock Creek Lake, 34°55′37″N 092°57′51″W, el. 387 feet (118 m)
- South Fouche Site Seven Reservoir, 35°00′46″N 092°49′32″W, el. 410 feet (120 m)
- South Fouche Site Six Reservoir, 34°55′37″N 092°57′51″W, el. 387 feet (118 m)
- South Fourche Site One Reservoir, 34°51′54″N 093°11′27″W, el. 577 feet (176 m)
- The Campbells Lake, 34°56′36″N 092°34′19″W, el. 525 feet (160 m)
- Van Dalsen Lake, 34°59′36″N 092°44′31″W, el. 289 feet (88 m)
- Willenberg Lake, 35°02′06″N 092°54′37″W, el. 397 feet (121 m)
- Womack Lake, 35°02′30″N 092°51′13″W, el. 322 feet (98 m)

== See also ==
- List of lakes in Arkansas
