= List of lakes of Sevier County, Arkansas =

There are at least 13 named lakes and reservoirs in Sevier County, Arkansas.

== Lakes ==
- Berks Slough, 33°53′54″N 094°19′55″W, el. 295 feet (90 m)
- Johnson Lake, 34°00′18″N 094°11′21″W, el. 331 feet (101 m)
- Red Lake, 33°49′11″N 094°14′36″W, el. 269 feet (82 m)
- Russey Lake, 33°59′15″N 094°11′37″W, el. 328 feet (100 m)

== Reservoirs ==
- Coulter Lake, 33°57′57″N 094°07′56″W, el. 459 feet (140 m)
- De Queen Lake, 34°05′52″N 094°22′53″W, el. 374 feet (114 m)
- Dierks Lake, 34°08′42″N 094°06′01″W, el. 495 feet (151 m)
- Double K Lake, 33°53′43″N 094°17′25″W, el. 335 feet (102 m)
- Fraser Pond, 33°57′00″N 094°08′37″W, el. 407 feet (124 m)
- Gillham Lake, 34°10′24″N 094°19′13″W, el. 774 feet (236 m)
- Lake Hospitality, 33°49′12″N 094°03′31″W, el. 335 feet (102 m)
- Process City Lake, 34°01′19″N 094°22′04″W, el. 344 feet (105 m)
- Tobin Lake, 33°59′00″N 094°13′30″W, el. 328 feet (100 m)

== See also ==
- List of lakes in Arkansas
