= List of lakes of Johnson County, Arkansas =

There are at least 6 named lakes and reservoirs in Johnson County, Arkansas.

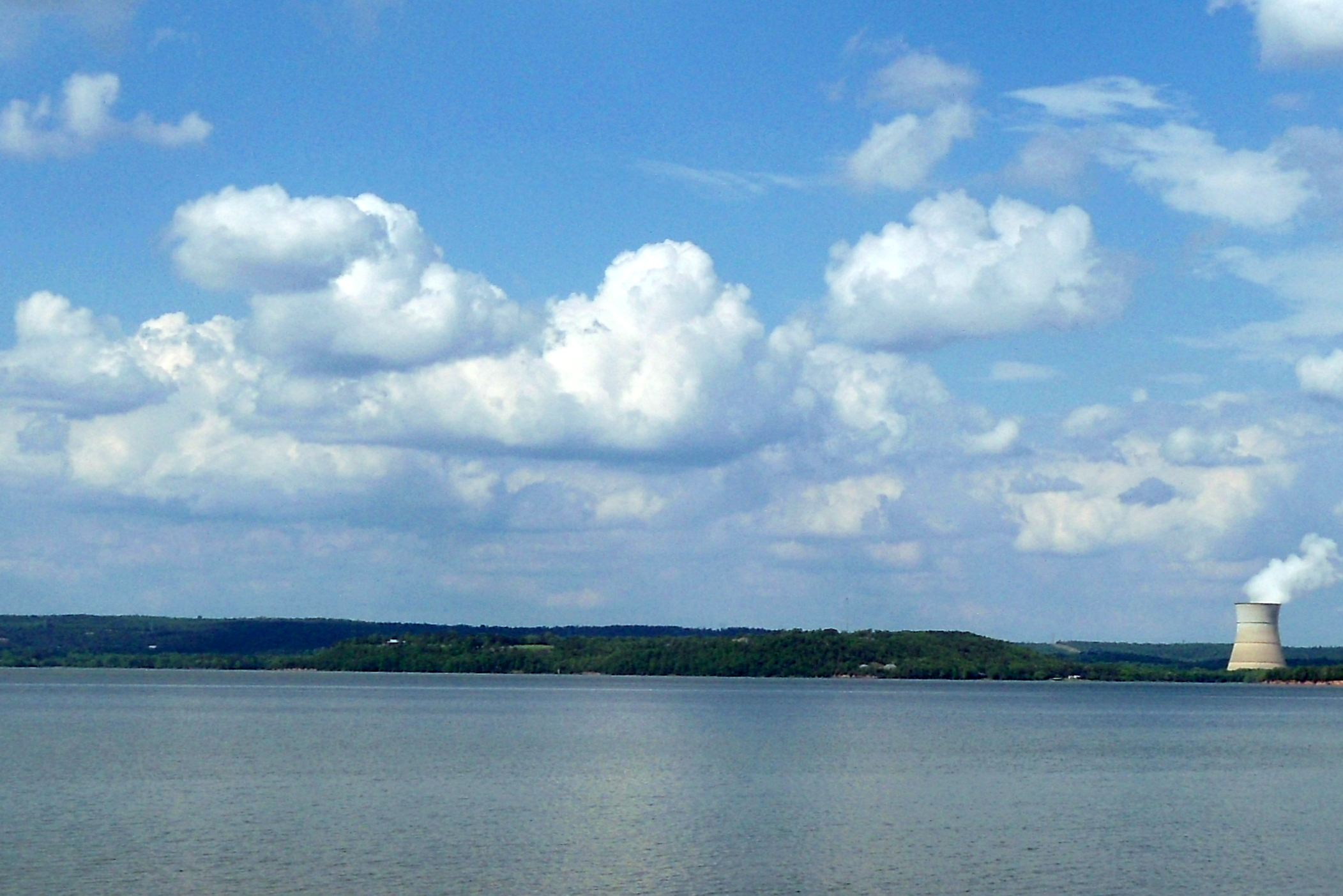
Lake Dardanelle

== Lakes ==
- Hartman Lake, 35°25′01″N 093°38′20″W, el. 344 feet (105 m)

== Reservoirs ==
- Harris Pond, 35°25′10″N 093°22′44″W, el. 404 feet (123 m)
- Horsehead Lake, 35°33′36″N 093°37′31″W, el. 673 feet (205 m)
- Lake Ludwig, 35°32′09″N 093°26′48″W, el. 551 feet (168 m)
- Lake Dardanelle, 35°21′14″N 093°23′46″W, el. 338 feet (103 m)
- Lake Ozone, 35°39′00″N 093°24′37″W, el. 1,850 feet (560 m)

== See also ==
- List of lakes in Arkansas
