= List of lakes of Lincoln County, Arkansas =

There are at least 25 named lakes and reservoirs in Lincoln County, Arkansas.

== Lakes ==
- Cane Creek Lake, 33°55′50″N 091°46′16″W, el. 177 feet (54 m)
- Douglas Old River Lake, 34°03′59″N 091°32′49″W, el. 164 feet (50 m)
- Echubby Lake, 33°59′45″N 091°25′36″W, el. 161 feet (49 m)
- Harm Coat Bayou, 33°57′08″N 091°39′11″W, el. 167 feet (51 m)
- Lake Dian, 34°01′41″N 091°27′48″W, el. 157 feet (48 m)
- Long Lake, 34°06′11″N 091°43′11″W, el. 184 feet (56 m)
- McDonald Lake, 34°09′15″N 091°43′16″W, el. 184 feet (56 m)
- Mud Lake, 34°01′35″N 091°27′00″W, el. 161 feet (49 m)
- Old River Lake, 34°08′41″N 091°41′52″W, el. 177 feet (54 m)
- Panther Slough, 33°59′12″N 091°40′38″W, el. 174 feet (53 m)
- Round Lake, 34°08′31″N 091°40′51″W, el. 180 feet (55 m)
- Sarassa Lake, 34°07′27″N 091°39′19″W, el. 174 feet (53 m)
- Taylor Old River, 34°03′37″N 091°28′32″W, el. 164 feet (50 m)

== Reservoirs ==
- Capps Lake, 33°57′12″N 091°56′41″W, el. 239 feet (73 m)
- Clowers Lake, 34°04′42″N 091°50′30″W, el. 207 feet (63 m)
- Farmers Lake, 33°51′26″N 091°40′20″W, el. 174 feet (53 m)
- Glover Lake, 33°53′00″N 091°54′07″W, el. 279 feet (85 m)
- Holthoff Reservoir, 33°58′05″N 091°37′15″W, el. 167 feet (51 m)
- Matthews Lake Dam, 33°49′02″N 091°44′27″W, el. 210 feet (64 m)
- McGraw Pond, 33°49′26″N 091°45′28″W, el. 226 feet (69 m)
- Patocca Lower Lake, 33°54′46″N 091°52′30″W, el. 308 feet (94 m)
- Patocca Upper Lake, 33°54′41″N 091°52′34″W, el. 318 feet (97 m)
- Pinchback Reservoir, 33°59′44″N 091°41′49″W, el. 174 feet (53 m)
- Shooks Reservoir, 33°58′11″N 091°41′47″W, el. 174 feet (53 m)
- Steeds Lake, 33°57′18″N 091°51′38″W, el. 266 feet (81 m)

== See also ==
- List of lakes in Arkansas
