= List of lakes of Lonoke County, Arkansas =

There are at least 42 named lakes and reservoirs in Lonoke County, Arkansas.

== Lakes ==
- Bearskin Lake, 34°42′50″N 092°03′58″W, el. 236 feet (72 m)
- Belcher Lake, 34°36′22″N 091°39′02″W, el. 194 feet (59 m)
- Buffalo Slough, 34°32′42″N 091°40′52″W, el. 194 feet (59 m)
- Clear Lake, 34°31′02″N 092°01′44″W, el. 223 feet (68 m)
- Coburn Brake, 34°29′42″N 091°47′00″W, el. 194 feet (59 m)
- Cooper Lake, 34°38′23″N 091°38′46″W, el. 197 feet (60 m)
- Dry Bayou, 34°42′21″N 092°05′21″W, el. 239 feet (73 m)
- Jarvis Lake, 34°40′22″N 091°42′10″W, el. 197 feet (60 m)
- Johnson Lake, 34°34′51″N 091°39′53″W, el. 194 feet (59 m)
- Jordan Brake, 34°33′55″N 091°45′45″W, el. 197 feet (60 m)
- Mound Pond, 34°38′48″N 092°04′14″W, el. 233 feet (71 m)
- Salt Lake, 34°33′12″N 091°52′41″W, el. 210 feet (64 m)
- Sheaffer Lake, 34°57′17″N 092°02′57″W, el. 262 feet (80 m)
- Shuffield Lake, 34°48′59″N 092°03′45″W, el. 236 feet (72 m)
- Swan Lake, 34°53′28″N 091°51′46″W, el. 230 feet (70 m)
- White Lake, 35°01′03″N 091°51′18″W, el. 203 feet (62 m)
- Young's Pond, 34°53′22″N 091°44′21″W, el. 220 feet (67 m)

== Reservoirs ==
- Burlesons Pond, 34°54′53″N 091°43′59″W, el. 217 feet (66 m)
- Catfish Lake, 35°02′24″N 092°03′01″W, el. 351 feet (107 m)
- Cooper Lake, 34°59′45″N 092°02′55″W, el. 338 feet (103 m)
- Davis Lake, 34°58′54″N 091°53′31″W, el. 249 feet (76 m)
- Indian Head Lake, 35°02′41″N 092°07′02″W, el. 335 feet (102 m)
- Indian Head Lake - South, 35°02′36″N 092°07′01″W, el. 374 feet (114 m)
- John Thompson Lake, 35°02′36″N 092°02′01″W, el. 361 feet (110 m)
- Keller Lake, 34°48′56″N 092°02′46″W, el. 233 feet (71 m)
- Lake Lemay, 34°56′22″N 091°56′34″W, el. 302 feet (92 m)
- Little Pond, 34°54′52″N 091°43′47″W, el. 223 feet (68 m)
- McCallie - North Lake, 34°53′00″N 091°44′54″W, el. 213 feet (65 m)
- McCallie - South Reservoir, 34°52′43″N 091°44′45″W, el. 213 feet (65 m)
- Mintons Lake, 34°58′43″N 091°55′51″W, el. 262 feet (80 m)
- Mound Lake, 34°38′29″N 092°04′56″W, el. 233 feet (71 m)
- Omni Lake, 35°01′28″N 092°01′53″W, el. 354 feet (108 m)
- Omni Lake Number Two, 35°01′27″N 092°02′33″W, el. 351 feet (107 m)
- Parker Lake, 34°41′05″N 091°43′40″W, el. 200 feet (61 m)
- Peterson Lake, 34°38′08″N 091°40′33″W, el. 203 feet (62 m)
- Pickthorne Lake, 34°55′03″N 092°03′59″W, el. 249 feet (76 m)
- Reservoir Number One, 34°53′25″N 091°44′22″W, el. 220 feet (67 m)
- Richmond Pond, 34°57′59″N 091°57′57″W, el. 282 feet (86 m)
- Rick Lake, 35°02′25″N 092°01′00″W, el. 305 feet (93 m)
- Sniders Pond, 34°48′50″N 091°46′16″W, el. 230 feet (70 m)
- Taton Lake, 34°58′59″N 092°02′08″W, el. 299 feet (91 m)
- Willow Lake, 34°59′39″N 092°02′57″W, el. 328 feet (100 m)

== See also ==
- List of lakes in Arkansas
