= List of lakes of Grant County, Arkansas =

There are at least 12 named lakes and reservoirs in Grant County, Arkansas.

== Lakes ==
- Moores Lake, 34°12′38″N 092°31′46″W, el. 187 feet (57 m)
- Nall Lake, 34°23′55″N 092°35′17″W, el. 230 feet (70 m)
- Tolar Lake, 34°14′00″N 092°34′33″W, el. 194 feet (59 m)
- Tull Lake, 34°26′05″N 092°35′52″W, el. 239 feet (73 m)

== Reservoirs ==
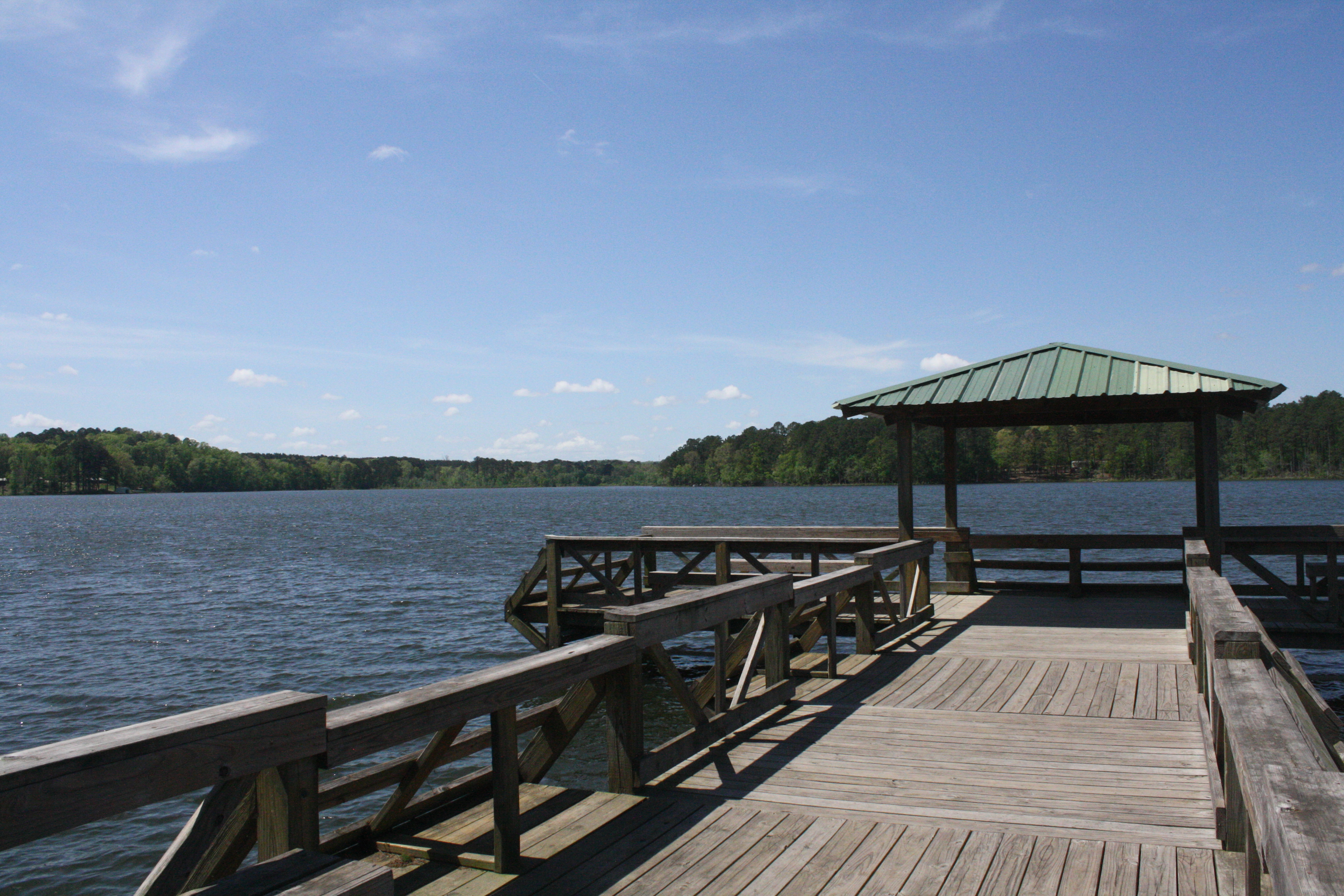
Pavilion on Cox Creek Lake

- Clear Lake, 34°18′42″N 092°12′49″W, el. 279 feet (85 m)
- Cox Creek Lake, 34°10′16″N 092°37′29″W, el. 256 feet (78 m)
- Fiser Lake, 34°25′17″N 092°28′09″W, el. 279 feet (85 m)
- Horne Lake, 34°16′46″N 092°28′09″W, el. 276 feet (84 m)
- Lake Brown, 34°17′00″N 092°23′47″W, el. 259 feet (79 m)
- Lake Kay, 34°26′53″N 092°23′22″W, el. 315 feet (96 m)
- Stephens Lake, 34°17′06″N 092°33′01″W, el. 236 feet (72 m)
- Whitworth Lake, 34°19′06″N 092°23′37″W, el. 233 feet (71 m)

== See also ==
- List of lakes in Arkansas
