= List of lakes of Greene County, Arkansas =

There are at least 14 named lakes and reservoirs in Greene County, Arkansas.

== Lakes ==
- Little Lake, 36°15′45″N 090°45′39″W, el. 26 feet (7.9 m)
- Swagger Slough, 36°15′31″N 090°42′29″W, el. 279 feet (85 m)

== Reservoirs ==
- Arnolds Lake, 36°05′06″N 090°31′48″W, el. 341 feet (104 m)
- Big Creek Site 15 Reservoir, 35°58′07″N 090°40′12″W, el. 371 feet (113 m)
- Big Creek Site One Reservoir, 35°59′32″N 090°41′06″W, el. 394 feet (120 m)
- Big Creek Site Three Reservoir, 35°58′14″N 090°42′40″W, el. 367 feet (112 m)
- Dickeys Lake, 36°10′54″N 090°25′06″W, el. 295 feet (90 m)
- Lake Ashbaugh, 36°15′40″N 090°45′45″W, el. 266 feet (81 m)
- Lake Frierson, 35°58′46″N 090°43′09″W, el. 367 feet (112 m)
- Meadow Lake, 36°05′51″N 090°31′53″W, el. 364 feet (111 m)
- Reynolds Park Lake, 36°04′23″N 090°31′47″W, el. 299 feet (91 m)
- Thompson Lake, 35°58′44″N 090°38′24″W, el. 433 feet (132 m)
- W.H. Spence Lake, 36°09′18″N 090°32′00″W, el. 364 feet (111 m)
- Walcot Lake, 36°02′54″N 090°40′01″W, el. 328 feet (100 m)

== See also ==
- List of lakes in Arkansas
