= List of lakes of Boone County, Arkansas =

There are at least 3 named lakes and reservoirs in Boone County, Arkansas.

== Lakes ==
According to the United States Geological Survey, there are no named lakes in Boone County.

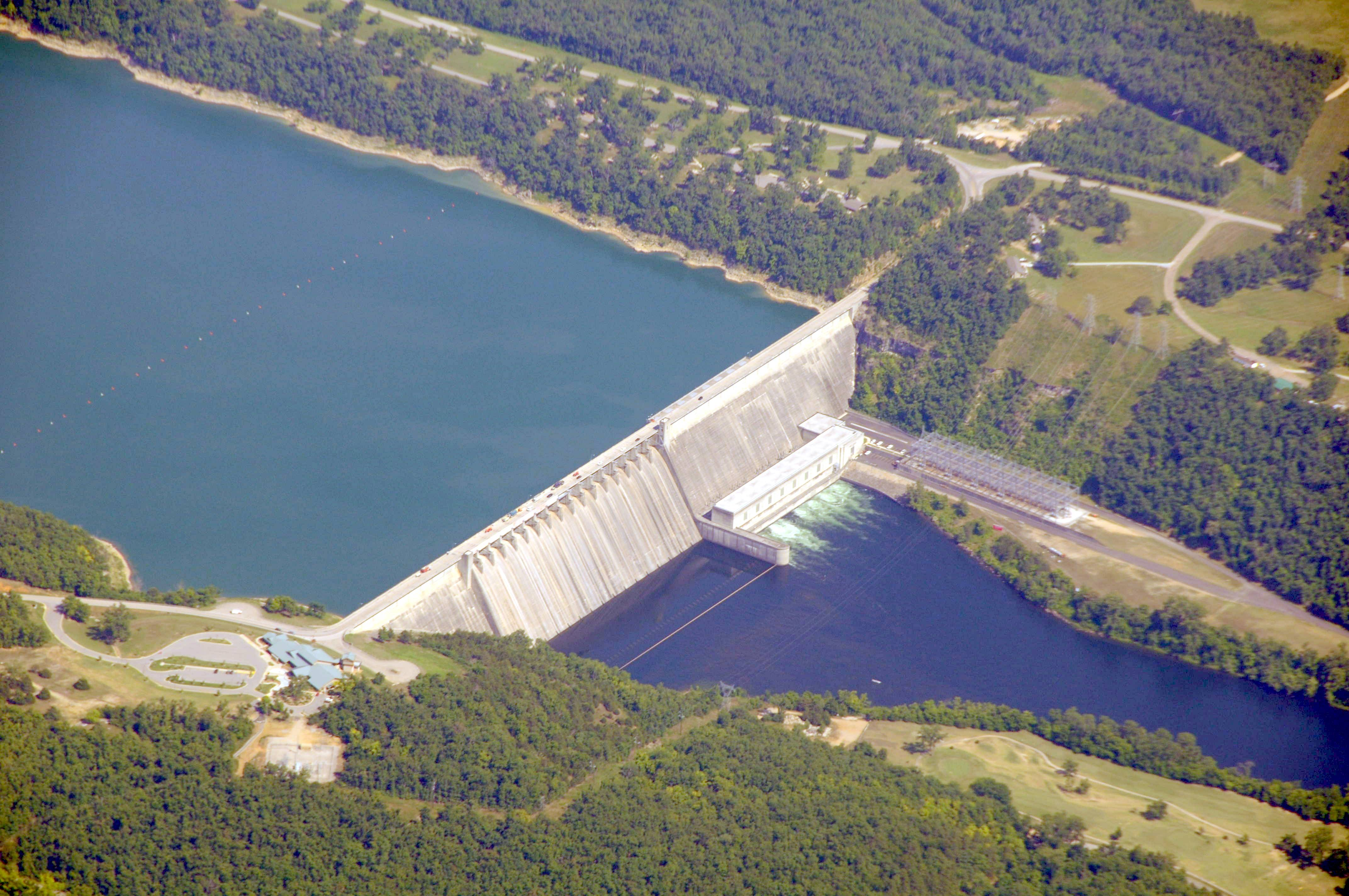
Bull Shoals Dam impounds the White River, creating Bull Shoals Lake. It is also the location of Bull Shoals-White River State Park (park visitor center in bottom left corner).

== Reservoirs ==
- Beaver Lodge Lake, 36°11′30″N 093°12′37″W, el. 1,598 feet (487 m)
- Bull Shoals Lake, 36°28′02″N 092°48′33″W, el. 653 feet (199 m)
- Table Rock Lake, 36°35′44″N 093°18′39″W, el. 791 feet (241 m)

== See also ==
- List of lakes in Arkansas
