= List of lakes of Union County, Arkansas =

There are at least 34 named lakes and reservoirs in Union County, Arkansas.

== Lakes ==
- Babb Lake, 33°21′09″N 092°32′11″W, el. 79 feet (24 m)
- Beaver Pond, 33°16′31″N 092°22′01″W, el. 79 feet (24 m)
- Benjamin Lake, 33°14′08″N 092°15′33″W, el. 72 feet (22 m)
- Blue Lake, 33°11′20″N 092°12′09″W, el. 72 feet (22 m)
- Bolding Lake, 33°07′38″N 092°11′32″W, el. 75 feet (23 m)
- Clear Lake, 33°01′07″N 092°06′39″W, el. 59 feet (18 m)
- Eagle Lake, 33°14′24″N 092°14′37″W, el. 72 feet (22 m)
- Fish Lake, 32°59′32″N 092°05′51″W, el. 62 feet (19 m)
- Fishtrap Lake, 33°08′19″N 092°09′22″W, el. 72 feet (22 m)
- Grand Marais, 33°04′13″N 092°09′11″W, el. 62 feet (19 m)
- Hoop Lake, 33°10′43″N 092°11′00″W, el. 62 feet (19 m)
- Jones Lake, 33°11′29″N 092°12′33″W, el. 72 feet (22 m)
- Little Lake, 33°01′32″N 092°07′43″W, el. 59 feet (18 m)
- Nickey Lake, 33°20′13″N 092°31′52″W, el. 85 feet (26 m)
- Open Brake, 33°07′32″N 092°08′07″W, el. 62 feet (19 m)
- Shaw Brake, 33°20′22″N 092°36′27″W, el. 89 feet (27 m)
- Spice Pond, 33°14′48″N 092°19′04″W, el. 85 feet (26 m)
- Stow Lake, 33°16′16″N 092°26′40″W, el. 75 feet (23 m)

== Reservoirs ==
- Anthony Lake, 33°18′19″N 092°34′16″W, el. 125 feet (38 m)
- Arkansas Noname 55 Reservoir, 33°02′42″N 092°11′12″W, el. 121 feet (37 m)
- Arkansas Noname 56 Reservoir, 33°02′30″N 092°11′18″W, el. 115 feet (35 m)
- Burns Pond, 33°12′41″N 092°50′54″W, el. 239 feet (73 m)
- Calion Lake, 33°19′09″N 092°32′05″W, el. 85 feet (26 m)
- Cooks Pond, 33°04′49″N 092°46′04″W, el. 167 feet (51 m)
- Forty Acre Millpond, 33°02′49″N 092°10′52″W, el. 85 feet (26 m)
- Harper Reservoir, 33°04′22″N 092°40′51″W, el. 167 feet (51 m)
- Harris Lake, 33°11′20″N 092°54′59″W, el. 266 feet (81 m)
- Lake Lisbon, 33°16′48″N 092°51′06″W, el. 184 feet (56 m)
- Lake Wingfield Number Three, 33°04′27″N 092°39′34″W, el. 180 feet (55 m)
- Lake Wingfield Number Two, 33°04′24″N 092°39′50″W, el. 177 feet (54 m)
- Lewis Lake, 33°02′04″N 092°56′38″W, el. 164 feet (50 m)
- Sowell Lake, 33°16′38″N 092°48′08″W, el. 174 feet (53 m)
- Twenty Acre Millpond, 33°02′33″N 092°11′11″W, el. 102 feet (31 m)
- Wingfield Lake, 33°04′24″N 092°39′50″W, el. 177 feet (54 m)

== See also ==
- List of lakes in Arkansas
