= List of lakes of Howard County, Arkansas =

There are at least 15 named lakes and reservoirs in Howard County, Arkansas.

== Lakes ==
- Wilson Pond, 33°47′58″N 093°51′58″W, el. 302 feet (92 m)

== Reservoirs ==
- Barnes Lake, 34°00′36″N 093°56′31″W, el. 577 feet (176 m)
- Briar Plant Lake One, 34°04′21″N 093°50′39″W, el. 489 feet (149 m)
- Briar Plant Lake Three, 34°05′00″N 093°51′37″W, el. 489 feet (149 m)
- Briar Plant Lake Two, 34°04′57″N 093°50′58″W, el. 492 feet (150 m)
- Davis Lake, 34°00′35″N 093°50′34″W, el. 538 feet (164 m)
- Dierks Lake, 34°08′42″N 094°06′01″W, el. 495 feet (151 m)
- Gillham Lake, 34°13′37″N 094°13′48″W, el. 505 feet (154 m)
- Kever Lake, 33°52′18″N 093°56′52″W, el. 374 feet (114 m)
- Lake Nickels, 33°57′38″N 093°50′34″W, el. 397 feet (121 m)
- McAdams Lake, 34°01′37″N 093°53′43″W, el. 646 feet (197 m)
- McClure Lake, 34°00′42″N 093°50′31″W, el. 561 feet (171 m)
- Millwood Lake, 33°41′45″N 093°57′41″W, el. 259 feet (79 m)
- North Fork Ozan Creek Site Four Reservoir, 34°00′06″N 093°49′49″W, el. 495 feet (151 m)
- Scotty Lake, 33°50′27″N 093°59′25″W, el. 285 feet (87 m)

== See also ==
- List of lakes in Arkansas
