= List of lakes of Searcy County, Arkansas =

There are at least 2 named lakes and reservoirs in Searcy County, Arkansas.

== Lakes ==
According to the United States Geological Survey, there are no named lakes in Searcy County, Arkansas.

== Reservoirs ==
- Baker Lake, 35°50′14″N 092°32′00″W, el. 1,535 feet (468 m)
- Lake Ferguson, 35°52′59″N 092°37′52″W, el. 1,578 feet (481 m)

== See also ==
- List of lakes in Arkansas
