= List of lakes of Pike County, Arkansas =

There are at least 10 named lakes and reservoirs in Pike County, Arkansas.

== Lakes ==
- Alford Lake, 34°01′43″N 093°41′52″W, el. 322 feet (98 m)
- Round Pond, 34°00′42″N 093°39′18″W, el. 302 feet (92 m)

== Reservoirs ==
- Lake Greeson, 34°14′28″N 093°47′22″W, el. 548 feet (167 m)
- Lake Greeson Nursery Pond, 34°09′32″N 093°44′43″W, el. 548 feet (167 m)
- Mill Pond, 34°17′00″N 093°30′19″W, el. 568 feet (173 m)
- North Fork Ozan Creek Watershed Number One Reservoir, 34°00′54″N 093°46′19″W, el. 492 feet (150 m)
- North Fork Ozan Creek Watershed Number Two Reservoir, 34°00′34″N 093°47′18″W, el. 492 feet (150 m)
- Teeter Lake, 34°00′57″N 093°45′34″W, el. 509 feet (155 m)
- Tetter Lake Two, 34°00′57″N 093°45′08″W, el. 512 feet (156 m)
- Womack Lake, 34°06′39″N 093°37′32″W, el. 594 feet (181 m)

== See also ==
- List of lakes in Arkansas
