= List of lakes of Sebastian County, Arkansas =

List of lentic freshwater bodies within Sebastian County, Arkansas, United States

There are at least 25 named lakes and reservoirs in Sebastian County, Arkansas.

== Lakes ==
- Courthouse Slough, 35°25′10″N 094°07′41″W, el. 394 feet (120 m)
- Greenwood Lake, 35°11′16″N 094°14′42″W, el. 522 feet (159 m)
- Lake Spur, 35°01′10″N 094°14′24″W, el. 709 feet (216 m)
- Sugar Loaf Lake, 35°05′32″N 094°24′25″W, el. 643 feet (196 m)

== Reservoirs ==
- Bailey Hill Reservoir, 35°21′51″N 094°25′04″W, el. 564 feet (172 m)
- Booneville Lake, 35°08′52″N 094°03′36″W, el. 535 feet (163 m)
- Crain Lake, 35°23′00″N 094°21′49″W, el. 436 feet (133 m)
- Crouch Lake, 35°18′46″N 094°09′11″W, el. 453 feet (138 m)
- Crowe Hill Reservoir, 35°20′48″N 094°23′45″W, el. 705 feet (215 m)
- Echols Lake, 35°21′30″N 094°23′14″W, el. 574 feet (175 m)
- Engineer Lake, 35°16′47″N 094°06′58″W, el. 440 feet (130 m)
- Gurisco Lake, 35°15′58″N 094°26′00″W, el. 466 feet (142 m)
- Lake Number One, 35°01′29″N 094°16′07″W, el. 656 feet (200 m)
- Lake Number Two, 35°00′54″N 094°16′55″W, el. 676 feet (206 m)
- Mansfield Lake, 35°03′30″N 094°14′07″W, el. 636 feet (194 m)
- McMahan Lake, 35°19′41″N 094°18′02″W, el. 446 feet (136 m)
- Number Name Lake, 35°21′30″N 094°07′33″W, el. 417 feet (127 m)
- Park Lake, 35°00′54″N 094°15′31″W, el. 732 feet (223 m)
- Pool 13, 35°21′00″N 094°17′31″W, el. 387 feet (118 m)
- Sebastian Lake, 35°12′55″N 094°24′17″W, el. 604 feet (184 m)
- Shadow Lake, 35°13′57″N 094°17′59″W, el. 653 feet (199 m)
- Wildcat Mountain Lake, 35°22′01″N 094°20′56″W, el. 436 feet (133 m)
- Williamson Lake, 35°14′16″N 094°17′09″W, el. 587 feet (179 m)
- Willies Lake, 35°18′17″N 094°20′12″W, el. 495 feet (151 m)
- Wofford Lake, 35°13′20″N 094°26′03″W, el. 548 feet (167 m)

== See also ==
- List of lakes in Arkansas
