= List of lakes of Pope County, Arkansas =

There are at least 21 named lakes and reservoirs in Pope County, Arkansas.

== Lakes ==
- Flagg Lake, 35°12′01″N 093°05′28″W, el. 305 feet (93 m)
- Holla Bend, 35°10′58″N 093°04′57″W, el. 289 feet (88 m)
- Lodge Lake, 35°08′33″N 093°05′06″W, el. 299 feet (91 m)
- Long Lake, 35°08′29″N 093°05′12″W, el. 299 feet (91 m)

== Reservoirs ==
- Galla Creek Lake, 35°16′12″N 093°02′58″W, el. 427 feet (130 m)
- Galla Creek Wildlife Lake, 35°10′42″N 093°01′14″W, el. 305 feet (93 m)
- Galla Watershed Site One Reservoir, 35°15′48″N 093°03′07″W, el. 518 feet (158 m)
- Jones Lake, 35°14′18″N 093°02′07″W, el. 371 feet (113 m)
- Lake Atkins, 35°12′32″N 092°57′34″W, el. 318 feet (97 m)
- Lake Irvin, 35°13′04″N 093°07′14″W, el. 325 feet (99 m)
- Lake Russellville, 35°20′18″N 093°08′49″W, el. 420 feet (130 m)
- Lake Vinson, 35°22′21″N 093°16′39″W, el. 581 feet (177 m)
- Lake Yarbrough, 35°17′10″N 093°01′55″W, el. 804 feet (245 m)
- West Fork Point Remove Creek Site 10 Reservoir, 35°24′20″N 092°56′35″W, el. 522 feet (159 m)
- West Fork Point Remove Creek Site 11 Reservoir, 35°22′30″N 092°52′01″W, el. 476 feet (145 m)
- West Fork Point Remove Creek Site 17 Reservoir, 35°19′26″N 092°53′35″W, el. 322 feet (98 m)
- West Fork Point Remove Creek Site 18 Reservoir, 35°21′06″N 092°52′43″W, el. 361 feet (110 m)
- West Fork Point Remove Creek Site 19 Reservoir, 35°22′23″N 092°58′07″W, el. 591 feet (180 m)
- West Fork Point Remove Creek Site Eight Reservoir, 35°26′27″N 092°51′31″W, el. 587 feet (179 m)
- West Fork Point Remove Creek Site Nine Reservoir, 35°26′19″N 092°54′50″W, el. 522 feet (159 m)
- Winthrop Rockefeller Lake, 35°09′29″N 093°03′17″W, el. 285 feet (87 m)

== See also ==
- List of lakes in Arkansas
