= List of lakes of Hot Spring County, Arkansas =

There are at least 9 named lakes and reservoirs in Hot Spring County, Arkansas.

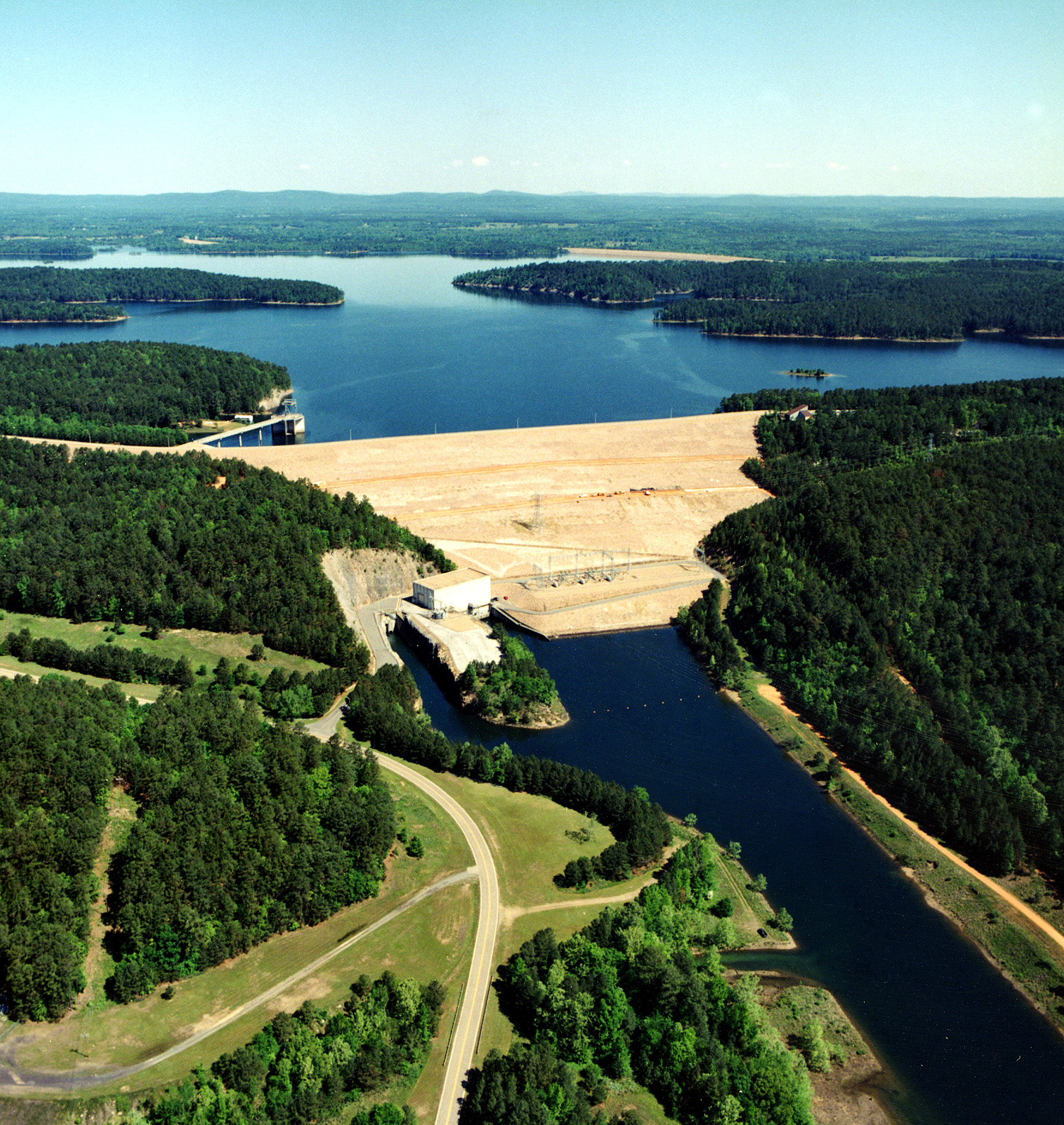
DeGray Dam and Lake

== Lakes ==
According to the United States Geological Survey, there are no named lakes in Hot Spring County.

== Reservoirs ==
- Clearwater Lake, 34°28′27″N 092°47′50″W, el. 525 feet (160 m)
- Crouchwood Lake, 34°28′00″N 092°54′55″W, el. 423 feet (129 m)
- DeGray Lake, 34°15′07″N 093°11′57″W, el. 400 feet (120 m)
- Jones Lake, 34°29′00″N 092°46′01″W, el. 449 feet (137 m)
- Kinzey Lake, 34°28′54″N 092°48′37″W, el. 614 feet (187 m)
- Lake Bobbie, 34°23′33″N 093°10′16″W, el. 591 feet (180 m)
- Lake Catherine, 34°25′36″N 092°53′13″W, el. 266 feet (81 m)
- Lower Lake, 34°29′10″N 092°46′12″W, el. 486 feet (148 m)
- Lucinda Lake, 34°29′09″N 092°48′33″W, el. 531 feet (162 m)

== See also ==
- List of lakes in Arkansas
