= List of lakes of Izard County, Arkansas =

There are at least 12 named lakes and reservoirs in Izard County, Arkansas.

== Lakes ==
- Dot Hole, 36°00′15″N 091°49′09″W, el. 643 feet (196 m)

== Reservoirs ==
- Bass Lake, 36°14′55″N 091°45′14″W, el. 709 feet (216 m)
- Cedar Glade Lake, 36°13′24″N 091°46′13″W, el. 797 feet (243 m)
- Crown Lake, 36°12′00″N 091°44′49″W, el. 673 feet (205 m)
- Crutchfield Lake, 36°05′36″N 091°46′25″W, el. 617 feet (188 m)
- Diamong Lake, 36°12′07″N 091°43′56″W, el. 630 feet (190 m)
- Gillihan Lake, 36°05′25″N 091°46′52″W, el. 610 feet (190 m)
- Lake Pioneer, 36°14′12″N 091°46′01″W, el. 761 feet (232 m)
- Lodge Lake, 36°13′34″N 091°45′23″W, el. 738 feet (225 m)
- North Lake, 36°15′19″N 091°44′48″W, el. 735 feet (224 m)
- Spiritual Development Lake, 36°15′14″N 091°52′37″W, el. 774 feet (236 m)
- White Oak Lake, 36°12′54″N 091°45′37″W, el. 728 feet (222 m)

== See also ==
- List of lakes in Arkansas
