= List of lakes of Mississippi County, Arkansas =

There are at least 15 named lakes and reservoirs in Mississippi County, Arkansas.

== Lakes ==
- Caney Old River, 35°38′40″N 090°12′36″W, el. 220 feet (67 m)
- Crooked Lake, 35°55′23″N 089°47′41″W, el. 249 feet (76 m)
- Half Moon Lake, 35°55′30″N 090°00′06″W, el. 239 feet (73 m)
- Long Lake, 35°50′27″N 089°49′40″W, el. 243 feet (74 m)
- Mink Lake, 35°26′29″N 090°11′06″W, el. 217 feet (66 m)
- Preston Lake, 35°31′54″N 089°56′19″W, el. 223 feet (68 m)
- Sky Lake, 35°31′58″N 090°16′27″W, el. 217 feet (66 m)
- Snake Lake, 35°27′27″N 090°15′18″W, el. 210 feet (64 m)
- Stave Lake, 35°26′15″N 090°11′28″W, el. 217 feet (66 m)
- Swan Lake, 35°27′24″N 090°10′51″W, el. 213 feet (65 m)
- The Chute, 35°40′08″N 089°51′31″W, el. 233 feet (71 m)
- Tupelo Lake, 35°30′44″N 090°16′31″W, el. 217 feet (66 m)
- West Bayou, 35°50′24″N 089°46′25″W, el. 249 feet (76 m)
- Woods Lake, 35°50′28″N 089°45′58″W, el. 249 feet (76 m)

== Reservoir ==
- Mallard Lake, 35°52′42″N 090°05′34″W, el. 239 feet (73 m)

== See also ==
- List of lakes in Arkansas
