= List of lakes of Stone County, Arkansas =

There are at least 4 named lakes and reservoirs in Stone County, Arkansas.

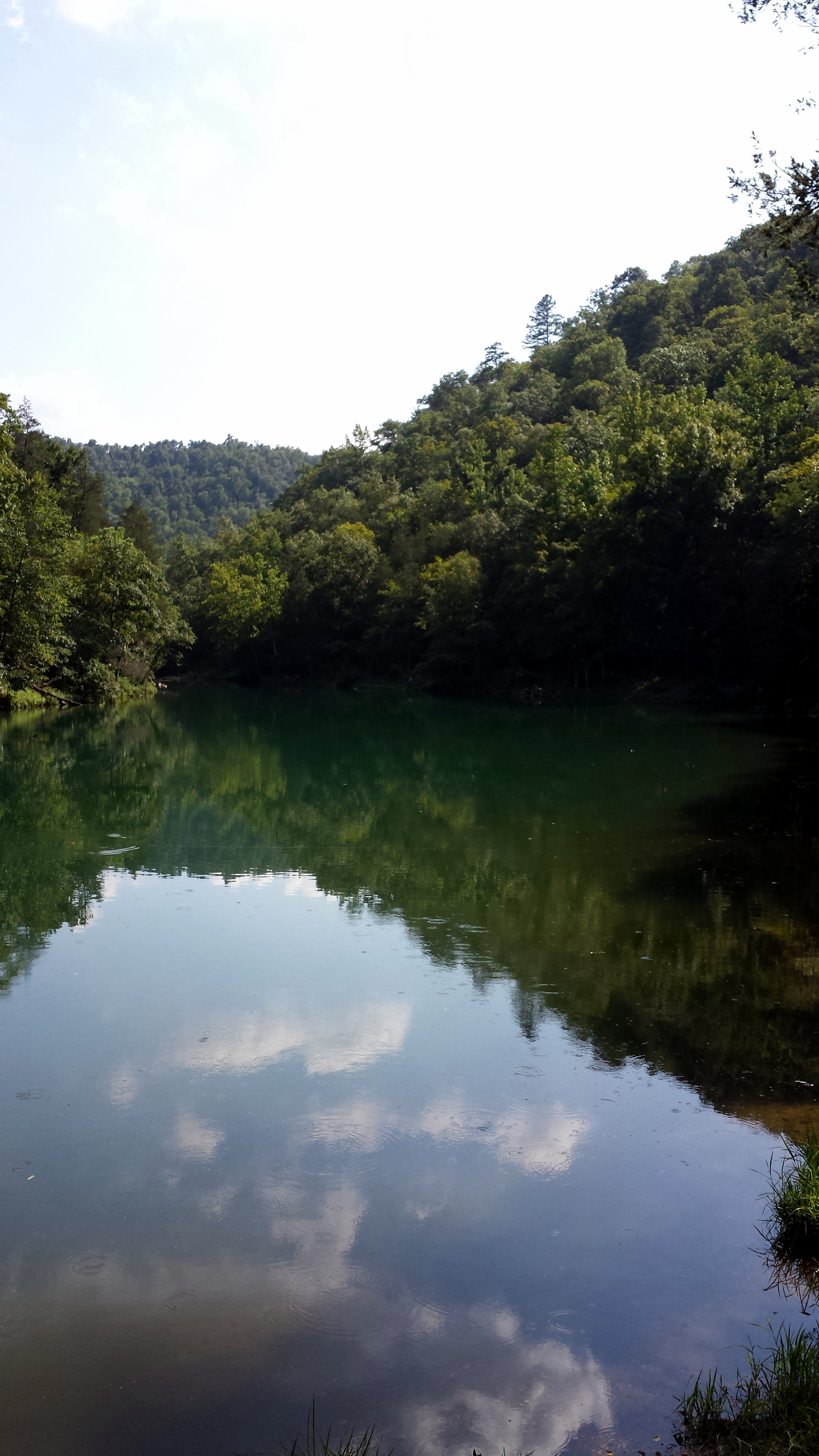
Mirror Lake near Blanchard Springs

== Lakes ==
According to the United States Geological Survey, there are no named lakes in Stone County, Arkansas.

== Reservoirs ==
- Crouch Lake, 35°46′54″N 092°17′19″W, el. 1,365 feet (416 m)
- Davis Lake, 35°49′36″N 091°55′03″W, el. 591 feet (180 m)
- Gunner Pool Lake, 35°59′39″N 092°12′53″W, el. 469 feet (143 m)
- Mirror Lake, 35°57′54″N 092°10′13″W, el. 427 feet (130 m)

== See also ==
- List of lakes in Arkansas
