= List of lakes of Fulton County, Arkansas =

There are at least 22 named lakes and reservoirs in Fulton County, Arkansas.

== Lakes ==
The only named natural lake in Fulton County is the Mill Pond (also known as Spring Lake). The lake is the central landmark of the Mammoth Spring State Park

== Reservoirs ==
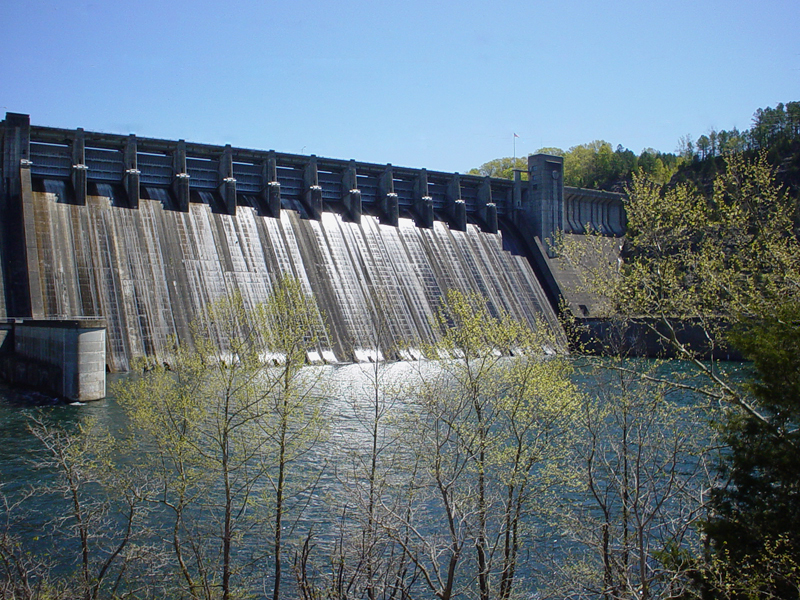
Norfork Dam

- Bulls Eye Lake, 36°21′06″N 091°55′31″W, el. 853 feet (260 m)
- Camp Kia Kima Lake, 36°21′16″N 091°36′17″W, el. 489 feet (149 m)
- Courtwright Lake, 36°24′01″N 091°45′52″W, el. 715 feet (218 m)
- Dogget Lake, 36°22′00″N 091°47′07″W, el. 702 feet (214 m)
- East Arkansas Council Boy Scouts Lake, 36°22′36″N 092°01′01″W, el. 764 feet (233 m)
- Fountain Lake, 36°16′36″N 092°00′19″W, el. 830 feet (250 m)
- Heldebrend Lake, 36°27′48″N 092°06′49″W, el. 817 feet (249 m)
- James Lake, 36°24′12″N 091°56′25″W, el. 961 feet (293 m)
- Lake Aztec, 36°17′36″N 091°36′01″W, el. 614 feet (187 m)
- Lake Bertie, 36°23′27″N 092°00′38″W, el. 807 feet (246 m)
- Lake Brown, 36°17′30″N 091°40′43″W, el. 722 feet (220 m)
- Lake Chanute, 36°17′36″N 091°34′35″W, el. 571 feet (174 m)
- Lake Leon, 36°22′30″N 091°54′01″W, el. 971 feet (296 m)
- Lake Lewis One, 36°23′18″N 091°45′01″W, el. 673 feet (205 m)
- Lake Omaha, 36°18′26″N 091°35′48″W, el. 512 feet (156 m)
- Langston Lake, 36°22′41″N 091°50′35″W, el. 735 feet (224 m)
- McCullough Lake, 36°18′22″N 091°45′58″W, el. 764 feet (233 m)
- Norfork Lake, 36°15′49″N 092°14′33″W, el. 548 feet (167 m)
- North Lake, 36°15′19″N 091°44′48″W, el. 735 feet (224 m)
- Sparks Lake, 36°23′57″N 091°58′06″W, el. 869 feet (265 m)
- Spring Lake, 36°25′00″N 091°53′43″W, el. 830 feet (250 m)
- Timber Lake, 36°16′09″N 091°38′10″W, el. 722 feet (220 m)
- Winlake Reservoir, 36°25′18″N 091°47′49″W, el. 853 feet (260 m)

== See also ==
- List of lakes in Arkansas
