= List of lakes of Arkansas =

There are at least 2,340 named lakes and reservoirs in Arkansas. The following list contains lists of lakes and reservoirs in Arkansas by county. Swimming, fishing, and/or boating are permitted in some of Arkansas’s lakes, but not all.

A lake is a terrain feature (or physical feature), a body of liquid on the surface of a world that is localized to the bottom of basin (another type of landform or terrain feature; that is not global). Another definition is a body of fresh or salt water of considerable size that is surrounded by land. On Earth a body of water is considered a lake when it is inland, not part of the ocean, is larger and deeper than a pond.

A reservoir (etymology from French réservoir a "storehouse) is an artificial lake used to store water. Reservoirs may be created in river valleys by the construction of a dam or may be built by excavation in the ground or by conventional construction techniques such a brickwork or cast concrete.

Lake/reservoir	Region	Acreage	Hectares
Lake Ouachita	Southwest	66,324	26,840
Bull Shoals Lake	Northwest	45,440	18,390
Lake Dardanelle	Northwest	34,300	13,900
Greers Ferry Lake	Northwest	31,500	12,700
Millwood Lake	Southwest	29,200	11,800
Beaver Lake	Northwest	28,220	11,420
Norfork Lake	Northeast	22,000	8,900
Lake Jack Lee	Southeast	15,000	6,100
DeGray Lake	Southwest	13,400	5,400
Ozark Lake	Northwest	10,600	4,300
Lake Maumelle	Central	8,900	3,600
Lake Hamilton	Southwest	7,460	3,020
Lake Erling	Southwest	7,000	2,800
Lake Conway	Central	6,700	2,700
Lake Chicot	Southeast	5,300	2,100

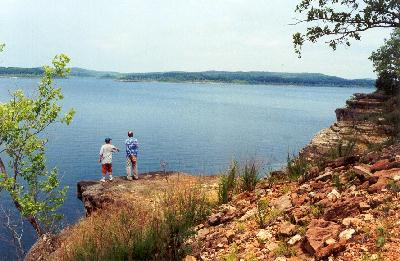
Arkansas shares Bull Shoals Lake with Missouri.

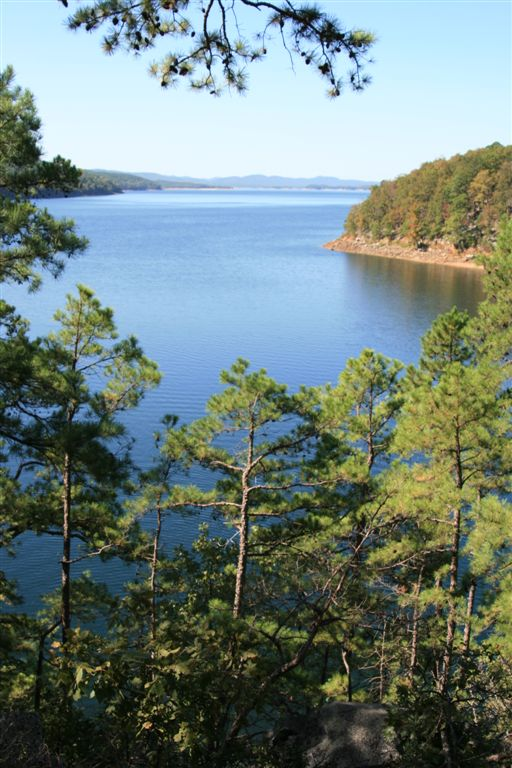
Lake Ouachita

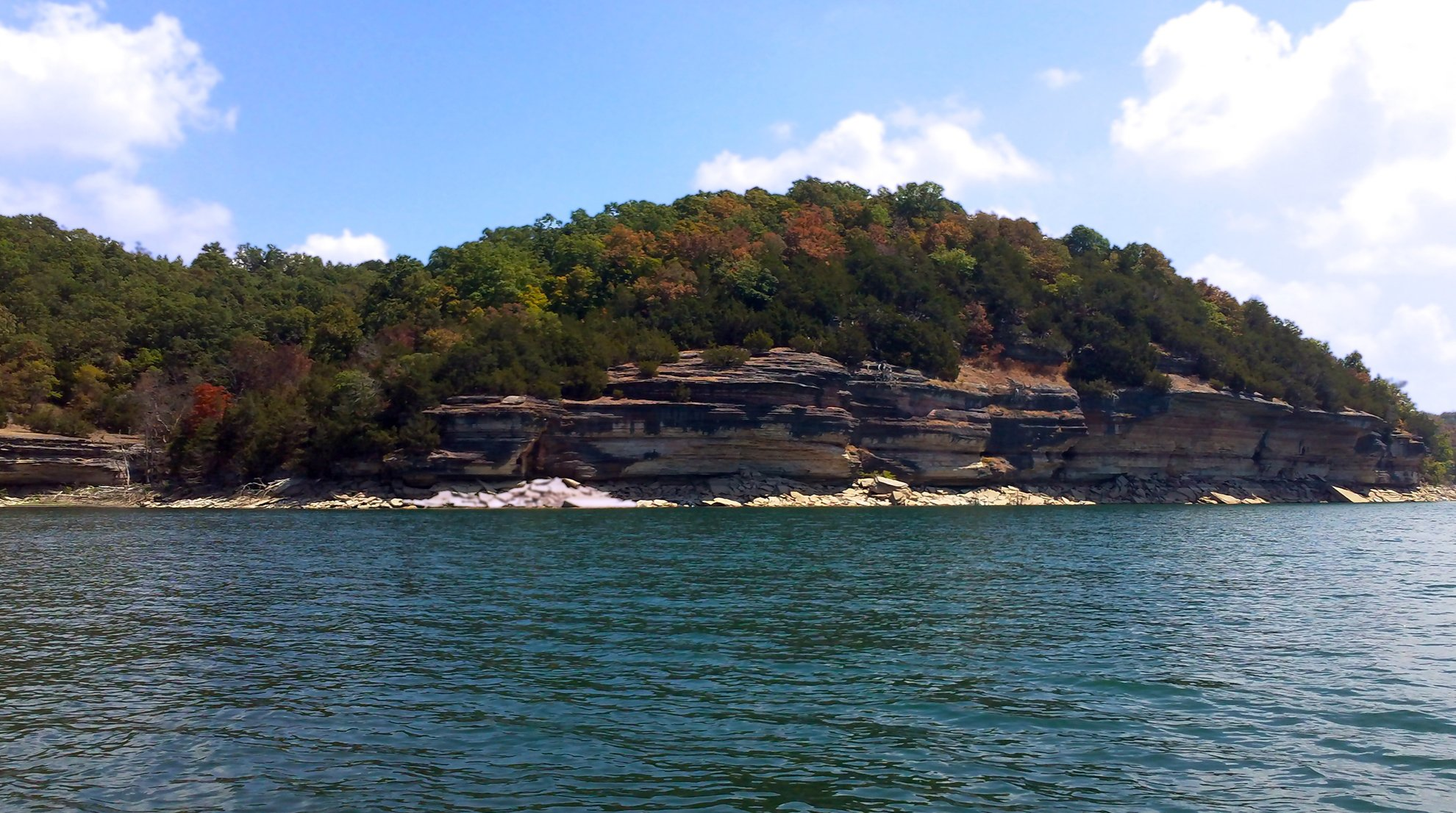
Beaver Lake

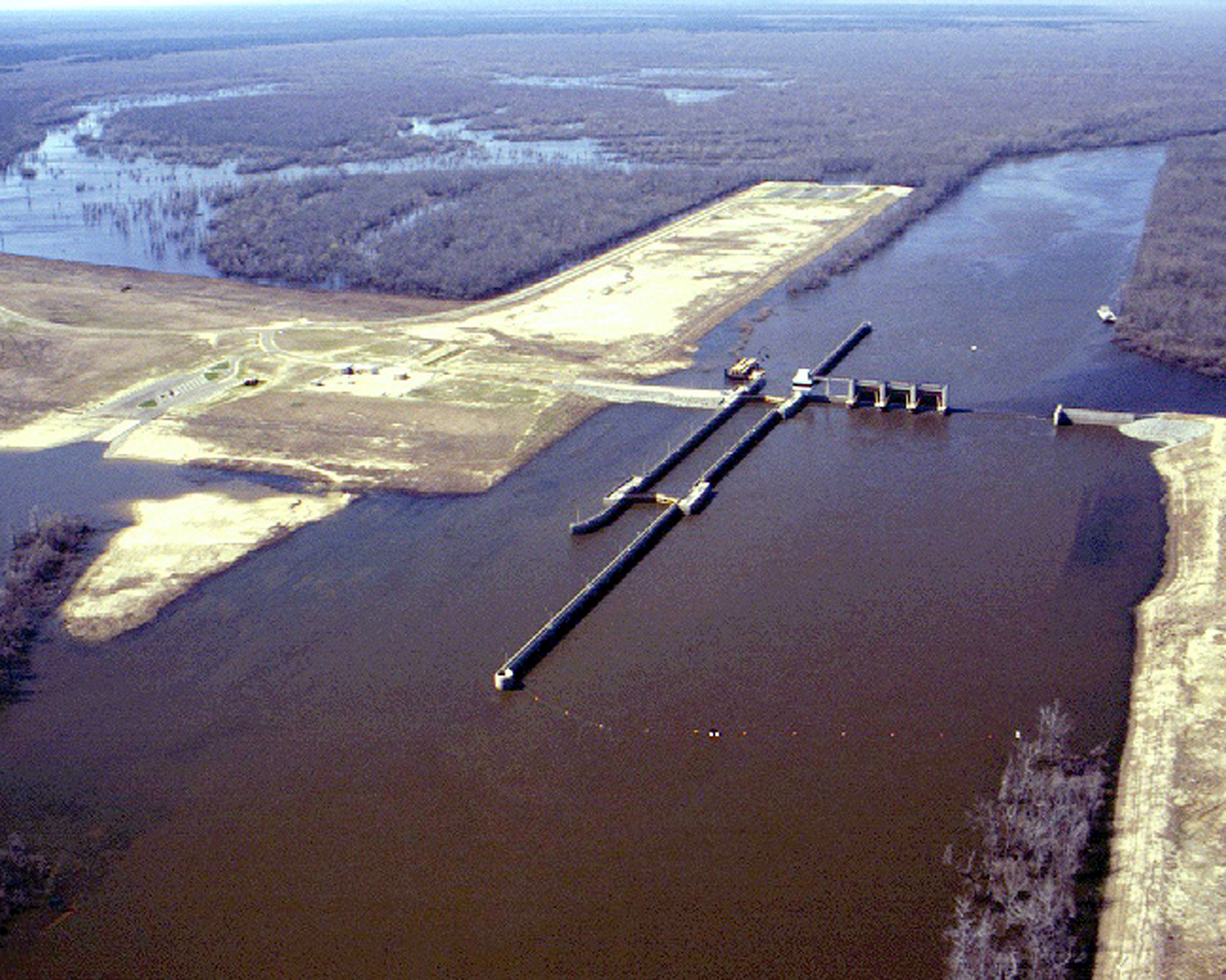
Lake Jack Lee is located in the Felsenthal National Wildlife Refuge.

== List of lakes by county ==
- List of lakes of Arkansas County, Arkansas
- List of lakes of Ashley County, Arkansas
- List of lakes of Baxter County, Arkansas
- List of lakes of Benton County, Arkansas
- List of lakes of Boone County, Arkansas
- List of lakes of Bradley County, Arkansas
- List of lakes of Calhoun County, Arkansas
- List of lakes of Carroll County, Arkansas
- List of lakes of Chicot County, Arkansas
- List of lakes of Clark County, Arkansas
- List of lakes of Clay County, Arkansas
- List of lakes of Cleburne County, Arkansas
- List of lakes of Cleveland County, Arkansas
- List of lakes of Columbia County, Arkansas
- List of lakes of Conway County, Arkansas
- List of lakes of Craighead County, Arkansas
- List of lakes of Crawford County, Arkansas
- List of lakes of Crittenden County, Arkansas
- List of lakes of Cross County, Arkansas
- List of lakes of Dallas County, Arkansas
- List of lakes of Desha County, Arkansas
- List of lakes of Drew County, Arkansas
- List of lakes of Faulkner County, Arkansas
- List of lakes of Franklin County, Arkansas
- List of lakes of Fulton County, Arkansas
- List of lakes of Garland County, Arkansas
- List of lakes of Grant County, Arkansas
- List of lakes of Greene County, Arkansas
- List of lakes of Hempstead County, Arkansas
- List of lakes of Hot Spring County, Arkansas
- List of lakes of Howard County, Arkansas
- List of lakes of Independence County, Arkansas
- List of lakes of Izard County, Arkansas
- List of lakes of Jackson County, Arkansas
- List of lakes of Jefferson County, Arkansas
- List of lakes of Johnson County, Arkansas
- List of lakes of Lafayette County, Arkansas
- List of lakes of Lawrence County, Arkansas
- List of lakes of Lee County, Arkansas
- List of lakes of Lincoln County, Arkansas
- List of lakes of Little River County, Arkansas
- List of lakes of Logan County, Arkansas
- List of lakes of Lonoke County, Arkansas
- List of lakes of Madison County, Arkansas
- List of lakes of Marion County, Arkansas
- List of lakes of Miller County, Arkansas
- List of lakes of Mississippi County, Arkansas
- List of lakes of Monroe County, Arkansas
- List of lakes of Montgomery County, Arkansas
- List of lakes of Nevada County, Arkansas
- List of lakes of Newton County, Arkansas
- List of lakes of Ouachita County, Arkansas
- List of lakes of Perry County, Arkansas
- List of lakes of Phillips County, Arkansas
- List of lakes of Pike County, Arkansas
- List of lakes of Poinsett County, Arkansas
- List of lakes of Polk County, Arkansas
- List of lakes of Pope County, Arkansas
- List of lakes of Prairie County, Arkansas
- List of lakes of Pulaski County, Arkansas
- List of lakes of Randolph County, Arkansas
- List of lakes of Saline County, Arkansas
- List of lakes of Scott County, Arkansas
- List of lakes of Searcy County, Arkansas
- List of lakes of Sebastian County, Arkansas
- List of lakes of Sevier County, Arkansas
- List of lakes of Sharp County, Arkansas
- List of lakes of St. Francis County, Arkansas
- List of lakes of Stone County, Arkansas
- List of lakes of Union County, Arkansas
- List of lakes of Van Buren County, Arkansas
- List of lakes of Washington County, Arkansas
- List of lakes of White County, Arkansas
- List of lakes of Woodruff County, Arkansas
- List of lakes of Yell County, Arkansas
