= List of lakes of Madison County, Arkansas =

There are at least four named lakes and reservoirs in Madison County, Arkansas.

== Lakes ==
- Dills Lakes, 35°58′58″N 093°54′57″W, el. 1,722 feet (525 m)

== Reservoirs ==
- Beaver Lake, 36°14′08″N 093°56′34″W, el. 1,122 feet (342 m)
- City of Huntsville Lake, 36°05′12″N 093°42′13″W, el. 1,260 feet (380 m)
- Hindsville Lake, 36°09′29″N 093°54′21″W, el. 1,316 feet (401 m)

== See also ==
- List of lakes in Arkansas
