= List of lakes of Clay County, Arkansas =

There are at least 29 named lakes and reservoirs in Clay County, Arkansas.

== Lakes ==
- Alligator Hole, 36°19′47″N 090°41′34″W, el. 266 feet (81 m)
- Beaver Pond, 36°29′10″N 090°11′30″W, el. 302 feet (92 m)
- Big Lake, 36°16′07″N 090°45′22″W, el. 266 feet (81 m)
- Corning Lake, 36°23′35″N 090°35′13″W, el. 269 feet (82 m)
- Field Lake, 36°26′26″N 090°44′11″W, el. 276 feet (84 m)
- Flat Lake, 36°19′47″N 090°38′31″W, el. 269 feet (82 m)
- Little Taylor Lake, 36°25′49″N 090°31′53″W, el. 279 feet (85 m)
- Long Lake, 36°22′31″N 090°35′44″W, el. 272 feet (83 m)
- Lost Lake, 36°25′07″N 090°31′51″W, el. 279 feet (85 m)
- Mill Lake, 36°20′13″N 090°38′15″W, el. 269 feet (82 m)
- Murphy Lake, 36°21′20″N 090°40′20″W, el. 269 feet (82 m)
- Old River, 36°27′54″N 090°08′59″W, el. 289 feet (88 m)
- Old River Lake, 36°21′57″N 090°34′28″W, el. 276 feet (84 m)
- Peoples Lake, 36°29′18″N 090°45′57″W, el. 285 feet (87 m)
- Poyner Lake, 36°22′03″N 090°33′29″W, el. 276 feet (84 m)
- Taylor Lake, 36°25′31″N 090°32′04″W, el. 276 feet (84 m)
- Victory Lake, 36°24′45″N 090°33′54″W, el. 269 feet (82 m)
- Woods Lake, 36°26′25″N 090°44′30″W, el. 279 feet (85 m)
- Woolfolk Lake, 36°23′19″N 090°32′28″W, el. 279 feet (85 m)

== Reservoirs ==
- Brigance Lake, 36°24′12″N 090°17′48″W, el. 407 feet (124 m)
- Cole Lake, 36°25′00″N 090°13′06″W, el. 436 feet (133 m)
- Copeland Lake, 36°19′18″N 090°15′30″W, el. 430 feet (130 m)
- Easterwood Lake, 36°17′30″N 090°20′00″W, el. 348 feet (106 m)
- Frie Lake, 36°22′06″N 090°22′48″W, el. 404 feet (123 m)
- Grazevich Lake, 36°24′30″N 090°18′58″W, el. 466 feet (142 m)
- Hughes Lake, 36°23′06″N 090°12′42″W, el. 338 feet (103 m)
- Moore Lake, 36°24′06″N 090°14′00″W, el. 407 feet (124 m)
- Nicholas Lake, 36°25′11″N 090°17′23″W, el. 374 feet (114 m)

== See also ==
- List of lakes in Arkansas
