= List of lakes of Cleveland County, Arkansas =

There are at least 13 named lakes and reservoirs in Cleveland County, Arkansas.

== Lakes ==
- Wilson Lake, 33°59′16″N 092°18′04″W, el. 148 feet (45 m)
- Upper Canada Lake, 34°01′29″N 092°18′56″W, el. 151 feet (46 m)
- Lower Canada Lake, 34°00′57″N 092°19′13″W, el. 151 feet (46 m)
- Gray's Lake, 33°57′57″N 092°17′35″W, el. 144 feet (44 m)
- Crane Lake, 33°48′25″N 092°07′59″W, el. 128 feet (39 m)

== Reservoirs ==
- Van Sadler Lake, 33°56′33″N 092°11′49″W, el. 217 feet (66 m)
- Studdard Lake, 34°01′56″N 092°05′05″W, el. 259 feet (79 m)
- Schultz Lake, 33°50′03″N 092°02′56″W, el. 217 feet (66 m)
- Larson Lake, 33°46′46″N 092°15′00″W, el. 239 feet (73 m)
- Lake Elrod, 33°56′24″N 092°09′44″W, el. 249 feet (76 m)
- Kesterson Lake, 33°53′02″N 092°00′36″W, el. 223 feet (68 m)
- Dunkeffie Lake, 34°02′01″N 092°07′58″W, el. 213 feet (65 m)
- Clements Pond, 33°56′08″N 092°19′04″W, el. 190 feet (58 m)

== See also ==
- List of lakes in Arkansas
