= List of lakes of Columbia County, Arkansas =

There are at least 17 named lakes and reservoirs in Columbia County, Arkansas.

== Lakes ==
According to the United States Geological Survey, there are no named lakes in Columbia County.

== Reservoirs ==
- Arkansas Louisiana Gas Lake, 33°05′42″N 093°23′37″W, el. 220 feet (67 m)
- Bearden Lake, 33°21′54″N 093°11′49″W, el. 341 feet (104 m)
- Byrd Lake, 33°05′40″N 093°17′17″W, el. 266 feet (81 m)
- Dupriest Lake, 33°27′10″N 093°12′32″W, el. 285 feet (87 m)
- Fallin Lake, 33°17′02″N 093°19′00″W, el. 295 feet (90 m)
- Fincher Lake, 33°26′13″N 093°13′02″W, el. 285 feet (87 m)
- Foster Lake, 33°22′03″N 093°03′23″W, el. 236 feet (72 m)
- Lake Columbia, 33°16′57″N 093°24′21″W, el. 239 feet (73 m)
- Lake Sue, 33°15′50″N 093°09′15″W, el. 325 feet (99 m)
- Maloch Lake, 33°06′07″N 093°16′45″W, el. 285 feet (87 m)
- Miller Lake, 33°12′41″N 093°12′06″W, el. 295 feet (90 m)
- Pittman Lake, 33°16′37″N 093°11′14″W, el. 325 feet (99 m)
- Powell Lake, 33°18′06″N 093°19′31″W, el. 282 feet (86 m)
- Rasberry Lake, 33°02′17″N 093°04′27″W, el. 233 feet (71 m)
- Sale Lake, 33°07′15″N 093°14′13″W, el. 266 feet (81 m)
- Weber Lake, 33°16′55″N 093°17′40″W, el. 282 feet (86 m)
- Wilson Lake, 33°19′36″N 093°02′54″W, el. 249 feet (76 m)

== See also ==
- List of lakes in Arkansas
