= List of lakes of Randolph County, Arkansas =

There are at least 33 named lakes and reservoirs in Randolph County, Arkansas.

== Lakes ==
- Brown Lake, 36°10′49″N 091°00′09″W, el. 246 feet (75 m)
- Bull Pizzle Lake, 36°11′09″N 091°00′57″W, el. 249 feet (76 m)
- Dishpan Lake, 36°14′42″N 090°58′17″W, el. 256 feet (78 m)
- Gas Plant Lake, 36°19′19″N 090°49′59″W, el. 262 feet (80 m)
- Horseshoe Lake, 36°13′50″N 090°59′16″W, el. 249 feet (76 m)
- Legate Lake, 36°20′36″N 090°48′31″W, el. 266 feet (81 m)
- Looney Lake, 36°22′18″N 091°06′37″W, el. 318 feet (97 m)
- McGuire Lake, 36°23′31″N 090°45′36″W, el. 269 feet (82 m)
- Old River Island Lake, 36°21′54″N 090°46′22″W, el. 272 feet (83 m)
- Old River Slough, 36°15′35″N 090°57′12″W, el. 249 feet (76 m)
- Peachtree Lake, 36°20′54″N 090°48′04″W, el. 256 feet (78 m)
- Round Lake, 36°08′16″N 091°04′05″W, el. 243 feet (74 m)
- Schnabaum Lake, 36°17′18″N 090°51′56″W, el. 253 feet (77 m)
- Shakybog Lake, 36°13′30″N 090°59′32″W, el. 259 feet (79 m)
- Sparkman Lake, 36°18′17″N 090°50′48″W, el. 272 feet (83 m)
- Straight Lake, 36°08′31″N 091°04′19″W, el. 246 feet (75 m)
- Sumac Lake, 36°21′11″N 090°47′36″W, el. 262 feet (80 m)
- Wilson Lake, 36°09′33″N 091°01′42″W, el. 249 feet (76 m)
- Winebaugh Lake, 36°13′55″N 090°58′29″W, el. 256 feet (78 m)

== Reservoirs ==
- Allison Lake, 36°12′47″N 091°02′26″W, el. 354 feet (108 m)
- Baltz Lake, 36°16′34″N 090°57′42″W, el. 269 feet (82 m)
- Bates Lake, 36°17′10″N 090°58′49″W, el. 315 feet (96 m)
- Bibb Fish Pond, 36°11′42″N 091°03′42″W, el. 331 feet (101 m)
- Blue Basin Lake, 36°15′29″N 091°03′19″W, el. 335 feet (102 m)
- Fourche Creek Site 16 Reservoir, 36°26′48″N 091°02′18″W, el. 459 feet (140 m)
- Fourche Creek Site 17 Reservoir, 36°25′37″N 091°00′44″W, el. 397 feet (121 m)
- Fourche Creek Site 18 Reservoir, 36°24′01″N 091°02′04″W, el. 351 feet (107 m)
- Kilo-Vista Lake, 36°14′11″N 091°04′57″W, el. 285 feet (87 m)
- Lemmons Lake, 36°10′45″N 091°04′19″W, el. 276 feet (84 m)
- Lost Lake, 36°19′57″N 091°04′28″W, el. 394 feet (120 m)
- Meadows Lake, 36°29′19″N 091°02′17″W, el. 449 feet (137 m)
- R J Barnett Lake, 36°24′06″N 090°50′30″W, el. 308 feet (94 m)
- Wallace Lake, 36°24′53″N 091°02′41″W, el. 420 feet (130 m)

== See also ==
- List of lakes in Arkansas
