= List of lakes of Van Buren County, Arkansas =

There are at least 10 named lakes and reservoirs in Van Buren County, Arkansas.

== Lakes ==
According to the United States Geological Survey, there are no named lakes in Van Buren County, Arkansas.

== Reservoirs ==
- B B Ranch Lake, 35°27′24″N 092°26′14″W, el. 1,007 feet (307 m)
- Brock Creek Lake, 35°29′35″N 092°48′16″W, el. 784 feet (239 m)
- Brock Creek Lake, 35°29′06″N 092°48′07″W, el. 781 feet (238 m)
- Choctaw Lake, 35°32′54″N 092°26′55″W, el. 738 feet (225 m)
- Clinton Lake, 35°35′30″N 092°26′09″W, el. 541 feet (165 m)
- Driver Creek Lake, 35°28′06″N 092°43′50″W, el. 623 feet (190 m)
- East Fork Point Remove Site One Reservoir, 35°27′54″N 092°33′49″W, el. 666 feet (203 m)
- East Fork Point Remove Site Two Reservoir, 35°28′00″N 092°34′01″W, el. 574 feet (175 m)
- Jackson Lake, 35°38′42″N 092°34′49″W, el. 1,463 feet (446 m)
- West Fork Point Remove Creek Site One Reservoir, 35°28′53″N 092°39′31″W, el. 646 feet (197 m)

== See also ==
- List of lakes in Arkansas
