= List of lakes of Nevada County, Arkansas =

There are at least 13 named lakes and reservoirs in Nevada County, Arkansas.

== Lakes ==
- Grassy Lake, 33°53′55″N 093°18′55″W, el. 203 feet (62 m)
- Suckles Lake, 33°53′48″N 093°24′18″W, el. 249 feet (76 m)

== Reservoirs ==
- Arkansas Noname 68 Reservoir, 33°41′54″N 093°10′25″W, el. 351 feet (107 m)
- Barham Lake Number 1, 33°37′50″N 093°13′55″W, el. 269 feet (82 m)
- Barham Lake Number Two, 33°38′01″N 093°13′42″W, el. 259 feet (79 m)
- Bee Bee Lake, 33°45′30″N 093°25′01″W, el. 256 feet (78 m)
- Dupriest Lake, 33°27′10″N 093°12′32″W, el. 285 feet (87 m)
- Hale Lake, 33°49′56″N 093°24′51″W, el. 354 feet (108 m)
- Heathlake Reservoir, 33°47′25″N 093°20′09″W, el. 295 feet (90 m)
- Lake Bradshaw, 33°28′22″N 093°13′36″W, el. 315 feet (96 m)
- Marlers Lake, 33°28′25″N 093°23′46″W, el. 305 feet (93 m)
- Rosston Lake, 33°33′54″N 093°17′01″W, el. 377 feet (115 m)
- Wilson Lake, 33°29′31″N 093°24′27″W, el. 344 feet (105 m)

== See also ==
- List of lakes in Arkansas
