= Choctaw Lake (Mississippi) =

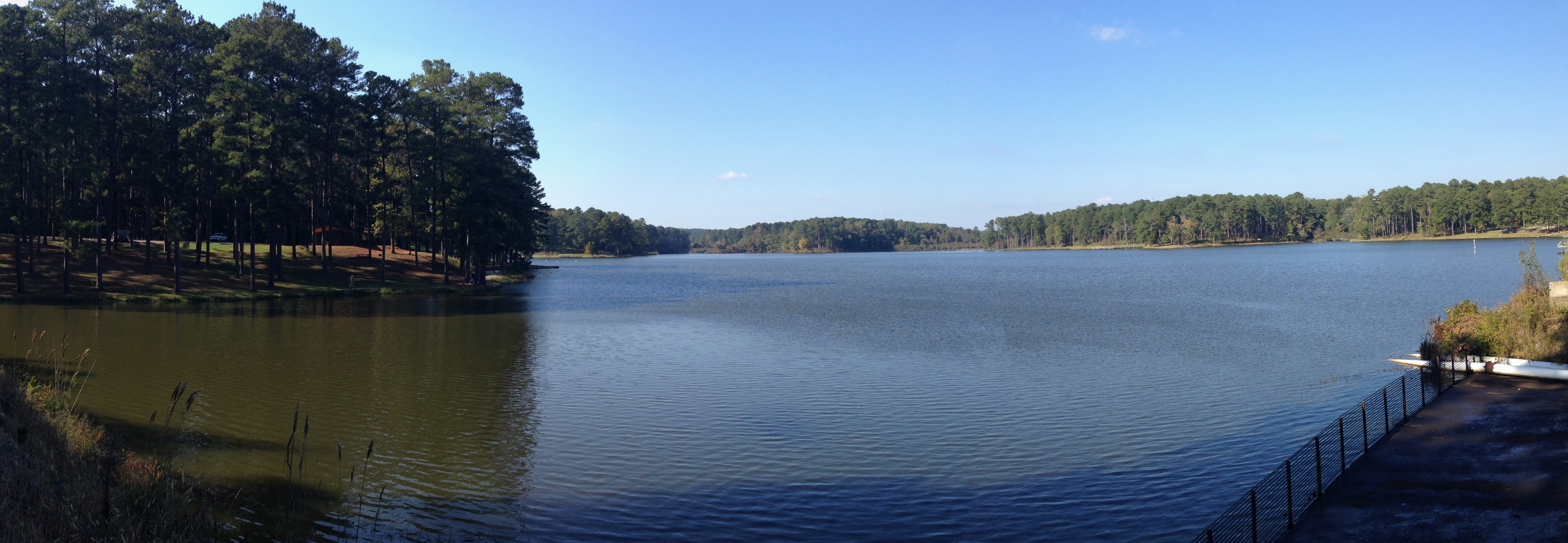
- Choctaw Lake

- Location within Mississippi Location within the United States
- Location: Choctaw County, Mississippi
- Coordinates: 33°16′33″N 89°08′31″W
- Type: reservoir
- Basin countries: United States
- Surface elevation: 460 ft (140 m)

Choctaw Lake is a reservoir in the U.S. state of Mississippi.

Choctaw Lake is named after the Choctaw Indians.
