= List of lakes of Prairie County, Arkansas =

There are at least 83 named lakes and reservoirs in Prairie County, Arkansas.

== Lakes ==
- Alligator Lake, 34°55′36″N 091°27′31″W, el. 167 feet (51 m)
- Bean Lake, 34°59′39″N 091°29′56″W, el. 174 feet (53 m)
- Belcher Lake, 34°36′22″N 091°39′02″W, el. 194 feet (59 m)
- Big Brushy Lake, 34°45′49″N 091°24′06″W, el. 164 feet (50 m)
- Big Twin Lake, 34°44′26″N 091°23′02″W, el. 161 feet (49 m)
- Big Twin Lake, 34°56′03″N 091°22′49″W, el. 171 feet (52 m)
- Prairie County, 34°51′29″N 091°27′26″W, el. 171 feet (52 m)
- Blind Basin, 35°01′02″N 091°33′17″W, el. 174 feet (53 m)
- Blue Hole, 34°53′59″N 091°25′45″W, el. 167 feet (51 m)
- Blue Lake, 34°48′23″N 091°27′14″W, el. 171 feet (52 m)
- Blue Lake, 35°02′12″N 091°23′03″W, el. 174 feet (53 m)
- Bob Williams Lake, 34°55′49″N 091°24′35″W, el. 174 feet (53 m)
- Cagles Eddy, 34°55′01″N 091°28′20″W, el. 164 feet (50 m)
- Choctaw Lake, 35°00′31″N 091°27′12″W, el. 174 feet (53 m)
- Clear Lake, 35°01′56″N 091°24′23″W, el. 180 feet (55 m)
- Coitier Basin, 35°00′55″N 091°33′14″W, el. 174 feet (53 m)
- Cooper Lake, 34°38′23″N 091°38′46″W, el. 197 feet (60 m)
- Goose Basin, 35°00′16″N 091°31′58″W, el. 174 feet (53 m)
- Goose Pond, 35°02′23″N 091°28′07″W, el. 180 feet (55 m)
- Graveyard Slough, 34°54′42″N 091°23′28″W, el. 171 feet (52 m)
- Hall's Lake, 34°54′45″N 091°22′24″W, el. 164 feet (50 m)
- Harvey Lake, 34°59′25″N 091°29′24″W, el. 174 feet (53 m)
- Hendricks Lake, 34°47′06″N 091°24′46″W, el. 171 feet (52 m)
- Hicks Lake, 35°01′27″N 091°28′41″W, el. 174 feet (53 m)
- Hill Lake, 35°02′47″N 091°28′28″W, el. 180 feet (55 m)
- Hodges Lake, 34°50′51″N 091°26′22″W, el. 171 feet (52 m)
- Horn Lake, 34°56′49″N 091°26′26″W, el. 174 feet (53 m)
- Horseshoe Lake, 34°48′28″N 091°26′37″W, el. 171 feet (52 m)
- Horseshoe Lake, 34°55′08″N 091°27′05″W, el. 174 feet (53 m)
- Horseshoe Lake, 35°01′09″N 091°29′23″W, el. 167 feet (51 m)
- Jake Williams Lake, 34°54′45″N 091°24′16″W, el. 171 feet (52 m)
- Keathley Pond, 35°05′08″N 091°32′12″W, el. 197 feet (60 m)
- Lindermans Lake, 35°01′57″N 091°38′32″W, el. 184 feet (56 m)
- Little Brushy Lake, 34°46′02″N 091°24′25″W, el. 167 feet (51 m)
- Little Gum Pond, 35°04′04″N 091°31′33″W, el. 180 feet (55 m)
- Little Lake, 35°03′08″N 091°39′25″W, el. 184 feet (56 m)
- Little Twin Lake, 34°55′50″N 091°22′55″W, el. 171 feet (52 m)
- Loggy Bayou, 35°02′36″N 091°27′28″W, el. 174 feet (53 m)
- Maloy Lake, 34°49′23″N 091°22′29″W, el. 161 feet (49 m)
- Miller Lake, 34°45′45″N 091°23′41″W, el. 164 feet (50 m)
- Moore's Lake, 34°50′37″N 091°28′09″W, el. 171 feet (52 m)
- Old River Lake, 34°47′01″N 091°24′11″W, el. 164 feet (50 m)
- Old River Lake, 34°59′50″N 091°30′05″W, el. 174 feet (53 m)
- Peppers Lake, 34°44′49″N 091°24′57″W, el. 161 feet (49 m)
- Roc Roe Lake, 34°43′57″N 091°22′47″W, el. 161 feet (49 m)
- Round Basin, 35°00′34″N 091°31′57″W, el. 174 feet (53 m)
- Round Lake, 34°56′37″N 091°28′31″W, el. 171 feet (52 m)
- Slaughters Lake, 34°42′53″N 091°23′00″W, el. 154 feet (47 m)
- Slippery Lake, 34°51′45″N 091°26′32″W, el. 177 feet (54 m)
- Spring Lake, 34°57′10″N 091°27′30″W, el. 171 feet (52 m)
- Straight Lake, 34°56′45″N 091°27′07″W, el. 174 feet (53 m)
- The Basin, 34°47′03″N 091°27′18″W, el. 157 feet (48 m)
- Twin Lakes, 34°59′22″N 091°28′37″W, el. 180 feet (55 m)
- Twin Lakes, 34°48′04″N 091°27′03″W, el. 171 feet (52 m)
- Tyler Lake, 34°39′45″N 091°40′29″W, el. 194 feet (59 m)
- Upshaw Lake, 34°47′21″N 091°25′58″W, el. 164 feet (50 m)
- Webb Lake, 34°49′52″N 091°27′55″W, el. 171 feet (52 m)

== Reservoirs ==
- Aker Reservoir, 34°34′57″N 091°29′51″W, el. 207 feet (63 m)
- Argo Reservoir, 34°47′29″N 091°28′59″W, el. 217 feet (66 m)
- Catfish Lake, 34°45′34″N 091°27′51″W, el. 220 feet (67 m)
- Crowley Lake, 34°52′01″N 091°34′24″W, el. 213 feet (65 m)
- Eddy Lake, 34°55′14″N 091°28′42″W, el. 194 feet (59 m)
- Floyds Reservoir, 34°50′19″N 091°35′56″W, el. 220 feet (67 m)
- Frakers Reservoir, 34°45′24″N 091°29′31″W, el. 210 feet (64 m)
- Hansons Reservoir, 34°46′48″N 091°39′10″W, el. 233 feet (71 m)
- Hartz Reservoir, 34°41′57″N 091°32′54″W, el. 207 feet (63 m)
- Holloway Pond, 35°04′02″N 091°32′02″W, el. 200 feet (61 m)
- Jerome Lake, 34°51′38″N 091°34′36″W, el. 213 feet (65 m)
- Joe Uhiren Reservoir, 34°41′18″N 091°41′16″W, el. 217 feet (66 m)
- Lake Des Arc, 35°01′29″N 091°30′53″W, el. 187 feet (57 m)
- Lake Treadway, 34°50′33″N 091°39′45″W, el. 230 feet (70 m)
- Lost Island Reservoir, 34°34′12″N 091°30′42″W, el. 203 feet (62 m)
- Menett Reservoir, 34°36′06″N 091°29′32″W, el. 197 feet (60 m)
- Miers Lake, 34°46′03″N 091°28′14″W, el. 213 feet (65 m)
- Newkirks Reservoir Number 1, 34°40′45″N 091°24′16″W, el. 207 feet (63 m)
- Newkirks Reservoir Number 2, 34°40′20″N 091°22′52″W, el. 171 feet (52 m)
- Omni Pond, 34°57′12″N 091°38′41″W, el. 213 feet (65 m)
- Stroh Reservoir, 34°41′49″N 091°29′28″W, el. 217 feet (66 m)
- Tates Reservoir, 34°59′27″N 091°33′15″W, el. 200 feet (61 m)
- Thomas Reservoir Number 2, 34°41′58″N 091°37′09″W, el. 220 feet (67 m)
- Whiskey Creek Reservoir, 34°43′40″N 091°25′01″W, el. 197 feet (60 m)
- Wing Meade Reservoir, 34°41′49″N 091°29′28″W, el. 217 feet (66 m)
- Wolf Reservoir, 34°35′06″N 091°31′42″W, el. 213 feet (65 m)

== See also ==
- List of lakes in Arkansas
