= Fish Lake =

Fish Lake may refer to:

== In New Zealand ==
- Fish Lake, Canterbury - see List of lakes in New Zealand

== In the United States ==
Populated places

- Fish Lake, Indiana, a small town
- Fish Lake Township, Minnesota

Lakes

- Fish Lake (Minnesota), in Chisago County
- Fish Lake (Jackson County, Oregon)
- Fish Lake (Marion County, Oregon)
- Fish Lake (Aurora County, South Dakota)
- Fish Lake (Deuel County, South Dakota)
- Fish Lake (Utah)
- Fish Lake, Arkansas County, Arkansas - see List of lakes in Arkansas County, Arkansas
- Fish Lake, Conway County, Arkansas - see List of lakes in Conway County, Arkansas
- Fish Lake, Hempstead County, Arkansas - see List of lakes in Hempstead County, Arkansas
- Fish Lake, Independence County, Arkansas - see List of lakes in Independence County, Arkansas
- Fish Lake, Lawrence County, Arkansas - see List of lakes in Lawrence County, Arkansas
- Fish Lake, Little River County, Arkansas - see List of lakes in Little River County, Arkansas
- Fish Lake, Monroe County, Arkansas - see List of lakes in Monroe County, Arkansas
- Fish Lake, Independence County, Arkansas - see List of lakes in Independence County, Arkansas
- Fish Lake, Woodruff County, Arkansas - see List of lakes in Woodruff County, Arkansas
- Fish Lake, Union County, Arkansas - see List of lakes in Union County, Arkansas
- Fish Lake, Park County, Montana - see List of lakes in Park County, Montana
- Fish Lake, Pondera County, Montana - see List of lakes in Pondera County, Montana
- Fish Lake, Ravalli County, Montana - see List of lakes in Ravalli County, Montana
- Fish Lake, Sweet Grass County, Montana - see List of lakes in Sweet Grass County, Montana

== See also ==
- List of lakes named Fish Lake
- Fish Lake Valley, Nevada and Fish Lake Valley
- Balyktykol (disambiguation)
