= Hidden Lake =

Hidden Lake or Hidden Lakes may refer to:

== Lakes ==
- Hidden Lake (Antarctica)

=== Canada ===
- Hidden Lake (Alberta), a lake in Banff National Park in Canada
- Hidden Lake (Vancouver Island), a lake in British Columbia, Canada
- Hidden Lake (Eldridge Township, Nipissing District), a lake in Eldridge Township, Nipissing District, Ontario
- Hidden Lake (Redditt Township, Kenora District), a lake in Redditt Township, Kenora District, Ontario
- Hidden Lake (Timiskaming District), a lake in Timiskaming District, Ontario
- Hidden Lake (Hastings County), a lake in Hastings County, Ontario
- Hidden Lake (Rainy River District), a lake in Rainy River District, Ontario
- Hidden Lake (Sioux Lookout), a lake in Sioux Lookout, Ontario
- Hidden Lake (Algoma District), a lake in Algoma District, Ontario
- Hidden Lake (Cochrane District), a lake in Cochrane District, Ontario
- Hidden Lake (Parkman Township, Nipissing District), a lake in Parkman Township, Nipissing District, Ontario
- Hidden Lake (Big Sand Lake, Kenora District), a tributary of Big Sand Lake, Kenora District, Ontario
- Hidden Lake (Clancy Township, Nipissing District), a lake in Clancy Township, Nipissing District, Ontario
- Hidden Lake (Frontenac County), a lake in Frontenac County, Ontario

=== United States ===
- Hidden Lake (Alaska), a lake near the Kenai River
- Hidden Lake (Sawtooth Wilderness), a lake in Sawtooth National Recreation Area, Idaho
- Hidden Lake (White Cloud Mountains), a lake in Sawtooth National Recreation Area, Idaho
- Hidden Lake, a lake of Beaverhead County, Montana
- Hidden Lake, a lake of Carbon County, Montana
- Hidden Lake (Flathead County, Montana)
- Hidden Lakes, a series of eight lakes in Gallatin County, Montana
- Hidden Lake, a lake of Granite County, Montana
- Hidden Lake, a lake of Jefferson County, Montana
- Hidden Lake, a lake of Mineral County, Montana
- Hidden Lake, a lake of Missoula County, Montana
- Hidden Lake, a lake of Pondera County, Montana
- Hidden Lake, a lake of Ravalli County, Montana
- Hidden Lake, a lake of Sweet Grass County, Montana
- Hidden Lakes (Nevada), a lake in Elko County
- Hidden Lake (Skagit County, Washington)

== Other uses ==
- Hidden Lake (horse), a Kentucky-bred mare
- Hidden Lake Academy, a boarding school in Dahlonega, Georgia
- Hidden Lake Airport, an airport in New Port Richey, Florida
- Hidden Lake Peaks, a series of peaks in Skagit County, Washington
