= List of lakes named Fish Lake =

Fish Lake is the name of many lakes:

== Canada ==
=== Alberta ===
- Fish Lake, four different lakes in Alberta
- Fish Lakes, a group of lakes in Alberta

=== British Columbia ===
- Fish Lake, two different lakes in the Cassiar Land District
- Fish Lake, two different lakes in the Kootenay Land District
- Fish Lake, in the Similkameen Division of the Yale Land District
- Fish Lake, two different lakes in the Coast Land District
- Fish Lake, in Range 4 Coast Land District
- Fish Lake, in Range 5 Coast Land District
- Fish Lake, in the Cariboo Land District (Chilcotin region)
- Fish Lake, three different lakes in the Lillooet the Land District
- Fish Lake Indian Reserve 5, an Indian Reserve in the Lillooet Land District
- Fish Lake Indian Reserve 7, an Indian Reserve in the Lillooet Land District
- Fish Lake, a former post office in the Lillooet Land District (now Brexton, British Columbia
- the name has also been used historically for many other lakes, including:
  - Darke Lake (Darke Lake Provincial Park) in the Okanagan region (Osoyoos Division, Yale Land District)

=== Manitoba ===
- Fish Lake, three different lakes in Manitoba

=== New Brunswick ===
- Fish Lake, a lake in Queens County
- Fish Lake, two different lakes in Victoria County
- Fish Lake, a lake in Northumberland County
- Fish Lake, two different lakes in York County
- Fish Lakes, a group of lakes in York County

=== Northwest Territories ===
- Fish Lake, four different lakes in the Mackenzie District of the Northwest Territories
- Fish Lake, in the Franklin District of the Northwest Territories

=== Nova Scotia ===
- Fish Lake, three different lakes in Halifax County
- Fish Lake, a lake in Pictou County
- Fish Lake, a lake in Guysborough County

=== Nunavut ===
- Fish Lake, a lake in Nunavut

=== Ontario ===
- Fish Lake, two different lakes in the Nipissing region
  - Fish Lake Mountain, a mountain in the Nipissing region
- Fish Lake, a lake in the Kenora region
- Fish Lake, a lake in the Parry Sound/Muskoka region
- Fish Lake, two different lakes in the Sudbury region
- Fish Lake, a lake in Frontenac County
- Fish Lake, a lake in Algoma County
- Fish Lake, a lake in Prince Edward County

=== Saskatchewan ===
- Fish Lake, five different lakes in Saskatchewan

=== Yukon ===
- Fish Lake, two different lakes in the Yukon Territory

== New Zealand ==
- Fish Lake, in the Nelson District on the South Island

== United States ==
=== Arkansas ===
- Fish Lake, in Arkansas County, Arkansas
- Fish Lake, in Conway County, Arkansas
- Fish Lake, in Hempstead County, Arkansas
- Fish Lake, in Independence County, Arkansas
- Fish Lake, in Lincoln County, Arkansas
- Fish Lake, in Little River County, Arkansas
- Fish Lake, in Miller County, Arkansas
- Fish Lake, in Monroe County, Arkansas
- Fish Lake, in Woodruff County, Arkansas

=== Colorado ===
- Fish Lake, east of Pagosa Springs
- Fish Lake, in Delta County

=== Illinois ===
- Fish Lake, in Lake County, previously known as Duncan Lake. 42°20′08″N 88°09′21″W

=== Indiana ===
- Fish Lake, in LaGrange County, Indiana
- Fish Lake, in LaPorte County, Indiana

=== Kentucky ===
(from Kentucky Gazetteer)

- Fish Lake, in Ballard County, Kentucky
- Fish Lake, in Carlisle County, Kentucky

=== Michigan ===
- Fish Lake, in Lapeer County, Michigan

=== Minnesota ===
- Fish Lake, in Chisago County, Minnesota
- Fish Lake, in Eagan, Dakota County, Minnesota
- Fish Lake, in Maple Grove, Hennepin County, Minnesota
- Fish Lake, in Jackson County, Minnesota
- Fish Lake, in Kanabec County, Minnesota
- Fish Lake, in Le Sueur County, Minnesota
- Fish Lake, in Cedar Township, Martin County, Minnesota
- Fish Lake, in Lake Belt Township, Martin County, Minnesota
- Fish Lake, in Scott County, Minnesota
- Fish Lake, in Fredenberg Township, St. Louis County, Minnesota

=== Montana ===
- Fish Lake in Lincoln County, Montana
- Fish Lake in Park County, Montana
- Fish Lake in Pondera County, Montana
- Fish Lake in Pondera County, Montana
- Fish Lake in Ravalli County, Montana
- Fish Lake in Sweet Grass County, Montana

=== Nevada ===
- Fish Lake, in Esmeralda County, Nevada

=== North Dakota ===
- Fish Lake, in Benson County, North Dakota
- Fish Lake, in Burke County, North Dakota

=== Oregon ===
(from Geographic Names Information System. USGS.)

- Fish Lake, in Baker County, Oregon
- Fish Lake, in Douglas County, Oregon
- Fish Lake, in Harney County, Oregon
- Fish Lake (Jackson County, Oregon)
- Fish Lake, in Josephine County, Oregon
- Fish Lake, three different lakes in Lake County, Oregon
- Fish Lake, in Linn County, Oregon
- Fish Lake (Marion County, Oregon)

=== South Dakota ===
- Fish Lake, in Aurora County, South Dakota
- Fish Lake, in Deuel County, South Dakota

=== Texas ===
- Fish Lake, in Fort Bend County, Texas
- Fish Lake, in Hardin County, Texas
- Fish Lake, in Panola County, Texas
- Fish Lake, in Rains County, Texas

=== Utah ===
- Fish Lake, in Sevier County, Utah
- Fish Lake, two separate lakes in Summit County, Utah
- Fish Lake, in Uintah County, Utah

=== Washington ===
(from Washington Place Names search)

- Fish Lake, in Chelan County, Washington
- Fish Lake, in Ferry County, Washington
- Fish Lake, in Grant County, Washington
- Fish Lake, in King County, Washington
- Fish Lake, in Kittitas County, Washington
- Fish Lake, in Okanogan County, Washington
- Fish Lake, in Spokane County, Washington
- Fish Lake, in Yakima County, Washington

== See also ==
- List of lakes
- Lists of lakes
