= List of lakes of Park County, Montana =

There are at least 164 named lakes and reservoirs in Park County, Montana.

== Lakes ==
- Aldridge Lake, 45°05′33″N 110°48′45″W, el. 5,876 feet (1,791 m)
- Alpine Lake, 45°27′47″N 110°25′03″W, el. 8,704 feet (2,653 m)
- Anvil Lake, 45°06′01″N 109°57′45″W, el. 9,465 feet (2,885 m)
- Aquarius Lake, 45°03′27″N 109°48′42″W, el. 9,153 feet (2,790 m)
- Arrastra Lake, 45°14′31″N 110°37′03″W, el. 9,180 feet (2,800 m)
- Astral Lake, 45°05′35″N 109°54′07″W, el. 9,308 feet (2,837 m)
- Basin Lake, 45°05′10″N 109°48′31″W, el. 9,872 feet (3,009 m)
- Beauty Lake, 45°06′20″N 109°58′16″W, el. 9,226 feet (2,812 m)
- Blacktail Lake, 45°32′05″N 110°25′41″W, el. 8,704 feet (2,653 m)
- Bob Lake, 45°05′12″N 109°55′07″W, el. 9,511 feet (2,899 m)
- Boulder Lakes, 45°04′00″N 109°49′23″W, el. 9,157 feet (2,791 m)
- Bridge Lake, 45°15′55″N 110°20′46″W, el. 9,504 feet (2,897 m)
- Broadwater Lake, 45°03′38″N 109°50′57″W, el. 8,386 feet (2,556 m)
- Campfire Lake, 46°04′10″N 110°24′02″W, el. 8,609 feet (2,624 m)
- Carpenter Lake, 45°07′10″N 110°23′53″W, el. 7,487 feet (2,282 m)
- Casey Lake, 45°04′05″N 110°40′15″W, el. 7,195 feet (2,193 m)
- Castle Lake, 45°08′30″N 110°36′43″W, el. 8,399 feet (2,560 m)
- Cave Lake, 46°04′13″N 110°19′23″W, el. 8,642 feet (2,634 m)
- Cavity Lake, 45°08′05″N 109°55′07″W, el. 10,033 feet (3,058 m)
- Charlie White Lake, 45°07′27″N 110°30′58″W, el. 8,497 feet (2,590 m)
- Cliff Lake, 45°05′11″N 109°51′48″W, el. 9,229 feet (2,813 m)
- Colley Lake, 45°13′42″N 110°26′02″W, el. 8,563 feet (2,610 m)
- Companion Lake, 45°04′56″N 109°54′14″W, el. 9,386 feet (2,861 m)
- Corner Lake, 45°04′17″N 109°54′02″W, el. 9,222 feet (2,811 m)
- Cottonwood Lake, 46°02′17″N 110°20′31″W, el. 8,845 feet (2,696 m)
- Courthouse Lake, 45°07′36″N 109°59′18″W, el. 9,314 feet (2,839 m)
- Crag Lake, 45°03′29″N 110°58′44″W, el. 8,783 feet (2,677 m)
- Crescent Lake, 45°03′38″N 110°59′39″W, el. 8,583 feet (2,616 m)
- Crevice Lake, 45°00′01″N 110°34′42″W, el. 5,561 feet (1,695 m)
- Crystal Lake, 45°22′05″N 110°23′35″W, el. 9,439 feet (2,877 m)
- Curl Lake, 45°03′10″N 109°50′33″W, el. 8,386 feet (2,556 m)
- Cutler Lake, 45°09′06″N 110°49′41″W, el. 5,295 feet (1,614 m), surface area: 9 acres (3.6 ha)
- Dailey Lake, 45°15′45″N 110°49′08″W, el. 5,246 feet (1,599 m), surface area: 206 acres (83 ha)
- Dead Horse Lakes, 46°05′56″N 110°22′38″W, el. 8,786 feet (2,678 m)
- Diamond Lake, 46°03′37″N 110°22′03″W, el. 9,176 feet (2,797 m)
- Dick Lake, 45°05′08″N 109°55′10″W, el. 9,514 feet (2,900 m)
- Dollar Lake, 45°03′05″N 109°49′13″W, el. 8,980 feet (2,740 m)
- Druckmiller Lake, 46°01′53″N 110°18′35″W, el. 8,920 feet (2,720 m)
- Elbow Lake, 45°22′27″N 110°29′02″W, el. 8,629 feet (2,630 m)
- Elk Lake, 45°13′42″N 110°18′54″W, el. 9,600 feet (2,900 m)
- Fawn Lake, 45°04′37″N 110°32′10″W, el. 8,878 feet (2,706 m)
- Ferrell Lake, 45°11′45″N 110°56′16″W, el. 5,771 feet (1,759 m)
- Finger Lake, 45°05′20″N 109°50′53″W, el. 9,675 feet (2,949 m)
- Fire Lake, 45°22′54″N 110°30′31″W, el. 9,550 feet (2,910 m)
- Fish Lake, 45°09′06″N 110°37′45″W, el. 8,947 feet (2,727 m)
- Fitzpatrick Lake, 45°38′54″N 110°21′30″W, el. 5,459 feet (1,664 m)
- Five Lakes, 45°06′51″N 110°41′28″W, el. 9,488 feet (2,892 m)
- Fizzle Lake, 45°05′40″N 109°48′28″W, el. 9,859 feet (3,005 m)
- Fly Lake, 45°07′13″N 109°58′10″W, el. 9,760 feet (2,970 m)
- Fox Lake, 45°01′48″N 109°48′20″W, el. 8,071 feet (2,460 m)
- Fulcrum Lake, 45°05′14″N 109°48′02″W, el. 9,708 feet (2,959 m)
- Gate Lake, 45°38′17″N 110°20′31″W, el. 5,932 feet (1,808 m)
- George Lake, 45°27′20″N 110°31′57″W, el. 7,713 feet (2,351 m)
- Glacier Green Lake, 45°08′38″N 109°55′26″W, el. 8,953 feet (2,729 m)
- Glacier Lake, 46°02′51″N 110°20′32″W, el. 8,763 feet (2,671 m)
- Goose Lake, 45°07′02″N 109°54′51″W, el. 9,865 feet (3,007 m)
- Granite Lake, 46°02′05″N 110°17′37″W, el. 8,205 feet (2,501 m)
- Grasshopper Lakes, 45°08′33″N 109°53′25″W, el. 10,348 feet (3,154 m)
- Green Lake, 45°06′00″N 109°54′07″W, el. 9,662 feet (2,945 m)
- Green Lake, 45°09′34″N 110°53′23″W, el. 6,404 feet (1,952 m)
- Hidden Lake, 45°03′51″N 110°16′28″W, el. 7,726 feet (2,355 m)
- High Lake, 45°03′24″N 110°56′19″W, el. 8,779 feet (2,676 m)
- Hilltop Lake, 45°05′49″N 109°55′14″W, el. 9,915 feet (3,022 m)
- Horseshoe Lake, 45°08′33″N 110°05′28″W, el. 9,239 feet (2,816 m)
- Horseshoe Lake, 45°34′42″N 110°17′12″W, el. 6,279 feet (1,914 m)
- Huckleberry Lake, 45°05′15″N 109°55′33″W, el. 9,501 feet (2,896 m)
- Imelda Lake, 45°09′58″N 109°54′40″W, el. 9,767 feet (2,977 m)
- Incisor Lake, 45°08′05″N 109°54′47″W, el. 9,629 feet (2,935 m)
- Jeff Lake, 45°05′22″N 109°56′12″W, el. 9,265 feet (2,824 m)
- Jewel Lake, 45°29′15″N 110°28′01″W, el. 8,986 feet (2,739 m)
- Kaufman Lake, 45°23′15″N 110°21′58″W, el. 8,934 feet (2,723 m)
- Kersey Lake, 45°01′43″N 109°50′27″W, el. 8,087 feet (2,465 m)
- Knott Lake, 45°09′39″N 109°53′10″W, el. 9,623 feet (2,933 m)
- La Velle Lake, 45°10′11″N 109°53′04″W, el. 9,856 feet (3,004 m)
- Lady of the Lake, 45°04′08″N 109°53′26″W, el. 8,753 feet (2,668 m)
- Lake Abundance, 45°05′22″N 110°00′46″W, el. 8,386 feet (2,556 m)
- Lake Aries, 45°06′43″N 109°58′01″W, el. 9,547 feet (2,910 m)
- Lake McKnight, 45°29′25″N 110°26′44″W, el. 9,186 feet (2,800 m)
- Lake of the Woods, 45°09′41″N 110°02′46″W, el. 8,747 feet (2,666 m)
- Leaky Raft Lake, 45°07′03″N 109°50′43″W, el. 10,154 feet (3,095 m)
- Leech Lake, 45°02′52″N 111°00′05″W, el. 8,717 feet (2,657 m)
- Lillis Lake, 45°01′03″N 109°50′26″W, el. 8,150 feet (2,480 m)
- Little Goose Lake, 45°07′34″N 109°54′29″W, el. 9,878 feet (3,011 m)
- Little Green Lake, 45°05′53″N 109°54′06″W, el. 9,623 feet (2,933 m)
- Little Joe Lake, 45°03′28″N 110°50′06″W, el. 7,877 feet (2,401 m)
- Little Molar Lake, 45°03′51″N 109°48′57″W, el. 9,311 feet (2,838 m)
- Lone Elk Lake, 45°06′44″N 109°49′55″W, el. 10,056 feet (3,065 m)
- Lone Lake, 45°03′33″N 109°54′25″W, el. 9,285 feet (2,830 m)
- Lone Lake, 46°02′49″N 110°21′42″W, el. 9,334 feet (2,845 m)
- Lonesome Pond, 45°10′42″N 110°36′03″W, el. 8,064 feet (2,458 m)
- Long Lake, 45°04′54″N 109°54′45″W, el. 9,422 feet (2,872 m)
- Looking Glass Lake, 45°06′37″N 109°48′36″W, el. 10,285 feet (3,135 m)
- Lost Lakes, 45°31′13″N 110°18′53″W, el. 6,273 feet (1,912 m)
- Lower Aero Lake, 45°06′31″N 109°51′52″W, el. 9,993 feet (3,046 m)
- Margaret Lake, 45°00′58″N 109°49′50″W, el. 8,107 feet (2,471 m)
- Marsh Lake, 45°03′30″N 109°52′18″W, el. 8,989 feet (2,740 m)
- Merrell Lake, 45°10′39″N 110°55′58″W, el. 5,925 feet (1,806 m)
- Moccasin Lake, 45°04′59″N 109°50′57″W, el. 9,432 feet (2,875 m)
- Molar Lake, 45°04′40″N 109°48′52″W, el. 9,875 feet (3,010 m)
- Moose Lake, 46°04′01″N 110°23′14″W, el. 7,858 feet (2,395 m)
- Mud Lake, 45°40′48″N 110°33′03″W, el. 4,514 feet (1,376 m)
- Mud Lake, 45°03′59″N 109°54′22″W, el. 9,308 feet (2,837 m)
- Mud Lake, 45°25′16″N 110°51′52″W, el. 8,894 feet (2,711 m)
- Mutt Lake, 45°05′30″N 109°56′13″W, el. 9,193 feet (2,802 m)
- No Bones Lake, 45°05′52″N 109°49′13″W, el. 9,990 feet (3,040 m)
- Nurses Lakes, 45°33′01″N 110°16′33″W, el. 6,335 feet (1,931 m)
- Oasis Lakes, 46°03′04″N 110°18′39″W, el. 8,766 feet (2,672 m)
- Ovis Lake, 45°04′41″N 109°55′11″W, el. 9,619 feet (2,932 m)
- Paddle Lake, 45°05′53″N 109°50′11″W, el. 10,082 feet (3,073 m)
- Panhandle Lake, 45°05′56″N 109°56′25″W, el. 9,583 feet (2,921 m)
- Peanut Lake, 45°05′13″N 109°51′17″W, el. 9,472 feet (2,887 m)
- Pear Lake, 46°01′26″N 110°18′20″W, el. 8,855 feet (2,699 m)
- Pine Creek Lake, 45°29′05″N 110°27′51″W, el. 9,065 feet (2,763 m)
- Pneumonia Lake, 45°05′52″N 109°50′38″W, el. 9,911 feet (3,021 m)
- Production Lake, 45°06′10″N 109°50′03″W, el. 10,075 feet (3,071 m)
- Rainbow Lake, 45°01′21″N 110°44′29″W, el. 5,882 feet (1,793 m)
- Recroitment Lake, 45°05′57″N 109°50′18″W, el. 10,065 feet (3,068 m)
- Redfield Lake, 45°33′57″N 110°18′38″W, el. 6,535 feet (1,992 m)
- Reed Lake, 45°00′27″N 109°50′08″W, el. 7,867 feet (2,398 m)
- Rock Island Lake, 45°00′58″N 109°48′37″W, el. 8,182 feet (2,494 m)
- Rock Lake, 46°01′06″N 110°19′54″W, el. 8,730 feet (2,660 m)
- Rough Lake, 45°07′15″N 109°49′35″W, el. 10,128 feet (3,087 m)
- Round Lake, 45°04′27″N 109°54′27″W, el. 9,350 feet (2,850 m)
- Sedge Lake, 45°03′14″N 109°49′04″W, el. 9,071 feet (2,765 m)
- Sedge Lake, 45°03′50″N 110°59′09″W, el. 8,871 feet (2,704 m)
- Shelf Lake, 45°05′33″N 111°00′45″W, el. 9,150 feet (2,790 m)
- Shelter Lake, 45°06′40″N 109°50′23″W, el. 10,069 feet (3,069 m)
- Shooting Star Lake, 45°05′19″N 110°57′39″W, el. 8,704 feet (2,653 m)
- Silver Lake, 45°21′40″N 110°21′02″W, el. 9,058 feet (2,761 m)
- Skull Lake, 45°05′09″N 109°48′11″W, el. 9,672 feet (2,948 m)
- Sky Top Lakes, 45°08′11″N 109°49′05″W, el. 10,469 feet (3,191 m)
- Slide Lake, 45°00′15″N 110°41′59″W, el. 5,712 feet (1,741 m)
- Smeller Lake, 46°00′18″N 110°18′08″W, el. 9,088 feet (2,770 m)
- Snow Lake, 45°06′17″N 109°54′15″W, el. 9,961 feet (3,036 m)
- Sodalite Lake, 45°05′05″N 109°49′03″W, el. 9,787 feet (2,983 m)
- Sourdough Lake, 45°06′54″N 109°58′07″W, el. 9,547 feet (2,910 m)
- Spider Lake, 45°07′10″N 109°57′58″W, el. 9,754 feet (2,973 m)
- Splinter Lake, 45°06′27″N 109°51′15″W, el. 10,335 feet (3,150 m)
- Sportsman Lake, 45°00′57″N 110°54′10″W, el. 7,710 feet (2,350 m)
- Star Dust Lake, 45°05′54″N 109°57′07″W, el. 9,550 feet (2,910 m)
- Star Lake, 45°05′42″N 109°54′36″W, el. 9,714 feet (2,961 m)
- Stash Lake, 45°05′32″N 109°50′11″W, el. 9,987 feet (3,044 m)
- Stepping Stone Lake, 45°06′37″N 109°48′36″W, el. 10,285 feet (3,135 m)
- Sunlight Lake, 46°06′36″N 110°23′22″W, el. 8,930 feet (2,720 m)
- Surprise Lake, 45°05′15″N 109°49′57″W, el. 9,856 feet (3,004 m)
- Swamp Lake, 45°03′42″N 109°52′56″W, el. 8,953 feet (2,729 m)
- Thompson Lake (Park County, Montana), 45°10′24″N 110°33′34″W, el. 7,880 feet (2,400 m)
- Trapper Lake, 45°28′39″N 110°23′49″W, el. 8,750 feet (2,670 m)
- Twin Lakes, 45°02′51″N 109°48′21″W, el. 8,674 feet (2,644 m)
- Twin Lakes, 46°02′43″N 110°18′31″W, el. 7,966 feet (2,428 m)
- Twin Lakes, 45°08′20″N 110°52′16″W, el. 6,384 feet (1,946 m)
- Upper Aero Lake, 45°07′40″N 109°50′25″W, el. 10,157 feet (3,096 m)
- Vernon Lake, 45°00′33″N 109°49′58″W, el. 7,874 feet (2,400 m)
- Wall Lake, 45°06′13″N 109°55′19″W, el. 9,783 feet (2,982 m)
- Washtub Lake, 45°04′55″N 109°51′45″W, el. 9,190 feet (2,800 m)
- Weasel Lake, 45°05′18″N 109°50′13″W, el. 9,957 feet (3,035 m)
- West Boulder Lake, 45°22′36″N 110°21′40″W, el. 9,626 feet (2,934 m)
- Wiedy Lake, 45°03′40″N 109°52′25″W, el. 8,986 feet (2,739 m)
- Wolf Lakes, 45°09′05″N 109°53′16″W, el. 9,793 feet (2,985 m)
- Wolf Voice Lake, 45°09′24″N 109°55′04″W, el. 9,990 feet (3,040 m)
- Wrong Lake, 45°08′14″N 109°57′49″W, el. 9,035 feet (2,754 m)
- Yankee Jim Lake, 45°08′56″N 110°52′04″W, el. 6,696 feet (2,041 m)
- Zimmer Lake, 45°07′11″N 109°53′04″W, el. 10,102 feet (3,079 m)

== Reservoirs ==
- Cottonwood Reservoir, 46°02′06″N 110°40′57″W, el. 5,105 feet (1,556 m)

== See also ==
- List of lakes in Montana
