= List of lakes of Granite County, Montana =

There are at least 75 named lakes and reservoirs in Granite County, Montana.

== Lakes ==
- Albicaulis Lake, 46°19′57″N 113°03′43″W, el. 7,730 feet (2,360 m)
- Alpine Lake, 46°20′15″N 113°03′04″W, el. 7,887 feet (2,404 m)
- Altoona Lakes, 46°23′49″N 113°05′40″W, el. 7,628 feet (2,325 m)
- Bielenberg Lake, 46°25′14″N 113°05′21″W, el. 7,470 feet (2,280 m)
- Boulder Lakes, 46°20′52″N 113°07′42″W, el. 7,510 feet (2,290 m)
- Carpp Lake, 46°00′43″N 113°27′12″W, el. 7,680 feet (2,340 m)
- Copper Creek Lakes, 46°20′45″N 113°09′49″W, el. 7,247 feet (2,209 m)
- Crystal Lake, 46°20′15″N 113°09′57″W, el. 7,664 feet (2,336 m)
- Dead Lake, 46°19′39″N 113°03′44″W, el. 7,703 feet (2,348 m)
- Dora Thorn Lake, 46°20′24″N 113°09′25″W, el. 7,493 feet (2,284 m)
- Echo Lake, 46°13′55″N 113°15′46″W, el. 6,676 feet (2,035 m)
- Edith Lake, 45°58′47″N 113°28′59″W, el. 7,858 feet (2,395 m)
- Flower Lake, 46°02′29″N 113°18′17″W, el. 8,514 feet (2,595 m)
- Fred Burr Lake, 46°18′27″N 113°09′57″W, el. 7,641 feet (2,329 m)
- Fuse Lake, 46°14′53″N 113°43′24″W, el. 7,684 feet (2,342 m)
- George Lake, 46°06′07″N 113°22′59″W, el. 7,024 feet (2,141 m)
- Goat Mountain Lakes, 46°22′46″N 113°03′24″W, el. 8,300 feet (2,500 m)
- Gold Creek Lakes, 46°26′30″N 113°03′31″W, el. 7,260 feet (2,210 m)
- Green Canyon Lake, 46°03′12″N 113°38′19″W, el. 7,428 feet (2,264 m)
- Green Lake, 46°17′10″N 113°05′01″W, el. 7,828 feet (2,386 m)
- Hidden Lake, 46°14′18″N 113°11′36″W, el. 7,274 feet (2,217 m)
- Hunters Lake, 46°16′04″N 113°03′03″W, el. 7,769 feet (2,368 m)
- Ivanhoe Lake, 45°59′06″N 113°32′57″W, el. 7,782 feet (2,372 m)
- Johnson Lake, 45°57′37″N 113°29′21″W, el. 7,648 feet (2,331 m)
- Kaiser Lake, 46°06′02″N 113°31′15″W, el. 5,984 feet (1,824 m)
- Kroger Pond, 46°18′16″N 113°17′29″W, el. 5,508 feet (1,679 m)
- Lake Abundance, 46°02′32″N 113°46′28″W, el. 7,237 feet (2,206 m)
- Lion Lake, 46°03′50″N 113°19′38″W, el. 7,871 feet (2,399 m)
- Little Fish Lake, 46°05′07″N 113°41′12″W, el. 6,824 feet (2,080 m)
- Little Fred Burr Lake, 46°18′49″N 113°10′40″W, el. 7,546 feet (2,300 m)
- Little Johnson Lake, 45°57′13″N 113°32′49″W, el. 8,035 feet (2,449 m)
- Little Racetrack Lake, 46°18′11″N 113°07′25″W, el. 7,467 feet (2,276 m)
- Lower Carpp Lake, 46°00′59″N 113°27′14″W, el. 7,671 feet (2,338 m)
- Martin Lake, 45°57′33″N 113°28′16″W, el. 8,323 feet (2,537 m)
- Meadow Lakes, 46°17′56″N 113°04′32″W, el. 7,785 feet (2,373 m)
- Meadow Lakes, 46°24′06″N 113°03′17″W, el. 7,306 feet (2,227 m)
- Medicine Lake, 46°07′32″N 113°40′38″W, el. 6,758 feet (2,060 m)
- Milo Lake, 46°10′03″N 113°32′47″W, el. 5,554 feet (1,693 m)
- Moose Lake, 46°03′07″N 113°31′54″W, el. 6,040 feet (1,840 m)
- Mud Lake, 46°19′30″N 113°06′48″W, el. 7,615 feet (2,321 m)
- Mud Lake, 46°13′57″N 113°45′26″W, el. 7,031 feet (2,143 m)
- Page Lake, 46°02′42″N 113°18′03″W, el. 8,320 feet (2,540 m)
- Phyllis Lake, 45°57′00″N 113°31′28″W, el. 7,943 feet (2,421 m)
- Porcupine Lake, 46°16′30″N 113°03′24″W, el. 7,746 feet (2,361 m)
- Potato Lakes, 46°09′10″N 113°29′16″W, el. 5,640 feet (1,720 m)
- Pozega Lakes, 46°16′58″N 113°04′25″W, el. 7,533 feet (2,296 m)
- Racetrack Lake, 46°18′34″N 113°08′01″W, el. 7,664 feet (2,336 m)
- Rainbow Lake, 46°26′45″N 113°03′48″W, el. 7,260 feet (2,210 m)
- Sauer Lake, 46°02′10″N 113°23′14″W, el. 8,189 feet (2,496 m)
- Sidney Lake, 46°20′40″N 113°08′56″W, el. 7,634 feet (2,327 m)
- Spruce Lake, 46°02′52″N 113°23′30″W, el. 8,058 feet (2,456 m)
- Stewart Lake (Granite County, Montana), 46°21′52″N 113°14′05″W, el. 6,716 feet (2,047 m)
- Stony Lake, 46°16′37″N 113°44′46″W, el. 7,103 feet (2,165 m)
- Susie Lake, 46°03′50″N 113°30′52″W, el. 6,230 feet (1,900 m)
- Tamarack Lake, 45°59′33″N 113°28′26″W, el. 8,304 feet (2,531 m)
- Thompson Lake (Granite County, Montana), 46°22′58″N 113°02′54″W, el. 7,943 feet (2,421 m)
- Thornton Lake, 46°15′33″N 113°02′18″W, el. 7,582 feet (2,311 m)
- Tolean Lake, 46°25′04″N 113°02′16″W, el. 7,782 feet (2,372 m)
- Upper Carpp Lake, 45°59′47″N 113°27′20″W, el. 8,340 feet (2,540 m)
- Upper Phyllis Lake, 45°56′48″N 113°31′20″W, el. 8,146 feet (2,483 m)
- Whetstone Lake, 46°04′20″N 113°37′22″W, el. 7,552 feet (2,302 m)

== Reservoirs ==
- Albicaulis Lake, 46°19′54″N 113°03′33″W, el. 7,730 feet (2,360 m)
- Alpine Lake, 46°20′12″N 113°03′15″W, el. 7,887 feet (2,404 m)
- Big Pozega Lake, 46°17′02″N 113°04′17″W, el. 7,533 feet (2,296 m)
- East Fork Reservoir, 46°07′51″N 113°22′52″W, el. 6,056 feet (1,846 m)
- Fisher Lake, 46°18′29″N 113°06′08″W, el. 7,447 feet (2,270 m)
- Georgetown Lake, 46°12′55″N 113°16′50″W, el. 6,361 feet (1,939 m)
- Gold Creek Lake, 46°26′30″N 113°03′33″W, el. 7,260 feet (2,210 m)
- Goldberg Reservoir, 46°30′03″N 113°04′13″W, el. 6,243 feet (1,903 m)
- Green Lake, 46°17′12″N 113°04′45″W, el. 7,805 feet (2,379 m)
- Little Pozega Lake, 46°16′42″N 113°04′28″W, el. 7,703 feet (2,348 m)
- Lower Willow Creek Reservoir, 46°33′34″N 113°18′53″W, el. 4,728 feet (1,441 m)
- Mud Lake, 46°19′30″N 113°00′03″W, el. 8,169 feet (2,490 m)
- Racetrack Lake, 46°18′06″N 113°07′57″W, el. 7,963 feet (2,427 m)
- Stephens Reservoir, 46°11′50″N 113°35′16″W, el. 6,381 feet (1,945 m)

== See also ==
- List of lakes in Montana
