= Utah State Route 25 =

State highway in Utah, United States

State Route 25
- Fishlake Scenic Byway

Route information
- Maintained by UDOT
- Length: 9.995 mi (16.085 km)
- Existed: 1918 as a state highway; 1927 as SR-25–present

Major junctions
- South end: SR-24 at Fish Lake Junction
- North end: Forest Service Road 319 at Fish Lake

Location
- Country: United States
- State: Utah

Highway system
- Utah State Highway System; Interstate; US; State; Minor; Scenic
← SR-24	→ SR-26

State Route 25 (SR-25), also part of the designated Fishlake Scenic Byway, is a state highway in the south central portion of the U.S. state of Utah. SR-25 runs from the junction of SR-24 near the town of Koosharem northeast to the west shore of Fish Lake. The highway runs for 9.995 miles (16.09 km).

== Route description ==
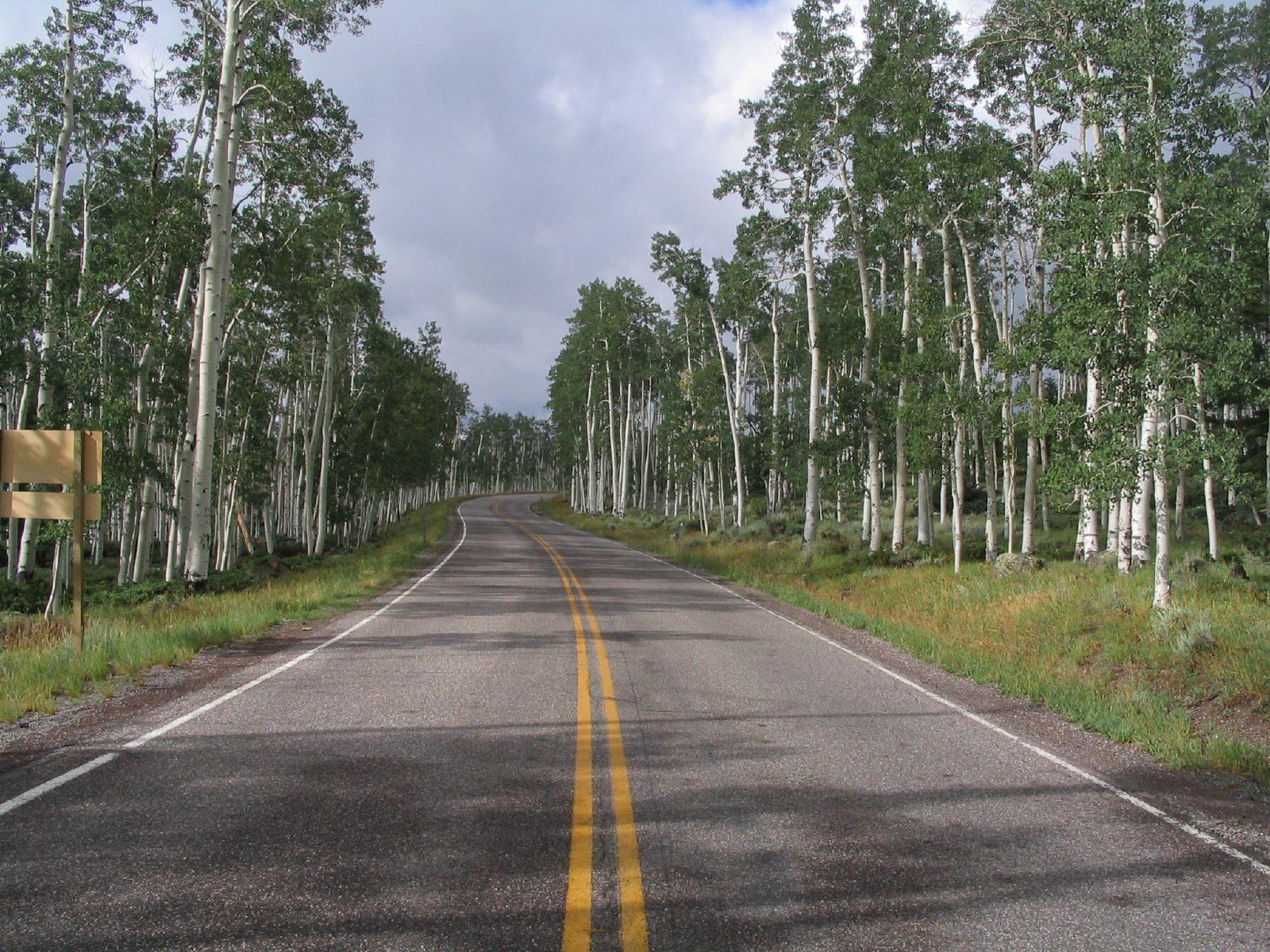
SR-25 approaching Fish Lake

Fishlake Scenic Byway is a route of 29.6 mi (47.6 km) that traverses mainly through the Fishlake National Forest, Utah. The byway comprises SR-25 and County Roads FAS-2554 and FAS-3268, beginning at SR-24, and running to SR-72. The byway starts at an intersection with SR-24 and immediately turns north-northeast through mountainous terrain before descending into a basin where Fish Lake is located. The route continues northeast and passes the west shore of Fish Lake, Johnson Valley Reservoir, and ending at the junction of SR-72, just nine miles northeast of the township of Loa in southeast Utah.

== History ==
The road from SR-24 at Plateau Junction east to Fish Lake was added to the state highway system in 1918, and numbered SR-25 by the state legislature in 1927. The west end was moved south to Fish Lake Junction in 1935 as a federal aid project, but the legislative description was not changed until 1953. The Fishlake Scenic Byway was designated on April 9, 1990 on SR-25 between SR-24 and Johnson Valley Reservoir. The Byway was extended in August 1992 between Johnson Valley Reservoir and SR-72 to comprise the southern portion of the Gooseberry/Fremont Road Scenic Backway.

Pando, a clonal quaking aspen stand, that, according to some sources, is the oldest (80,000 years) and largest (106 acres (0.43 km^{2}), 13,000,000 lb (5,900,000 kg)) organism on Earth, is located 1 mile (1.61 km) southwest of Fish Lake on Utah route 25.

== Major intersections ==
County	Location	mi	km	Destinations	Notes
Piute	Fish Lake Junction	0.000	0.000	SR-24 – Salina, Loa	Southern terminus
Sevier	Fish Lake	9.995	16.085	Forest Service Road 319	Northern terminus
1.000 mi = 1.609 km; 1.000 km = 0.621 mi

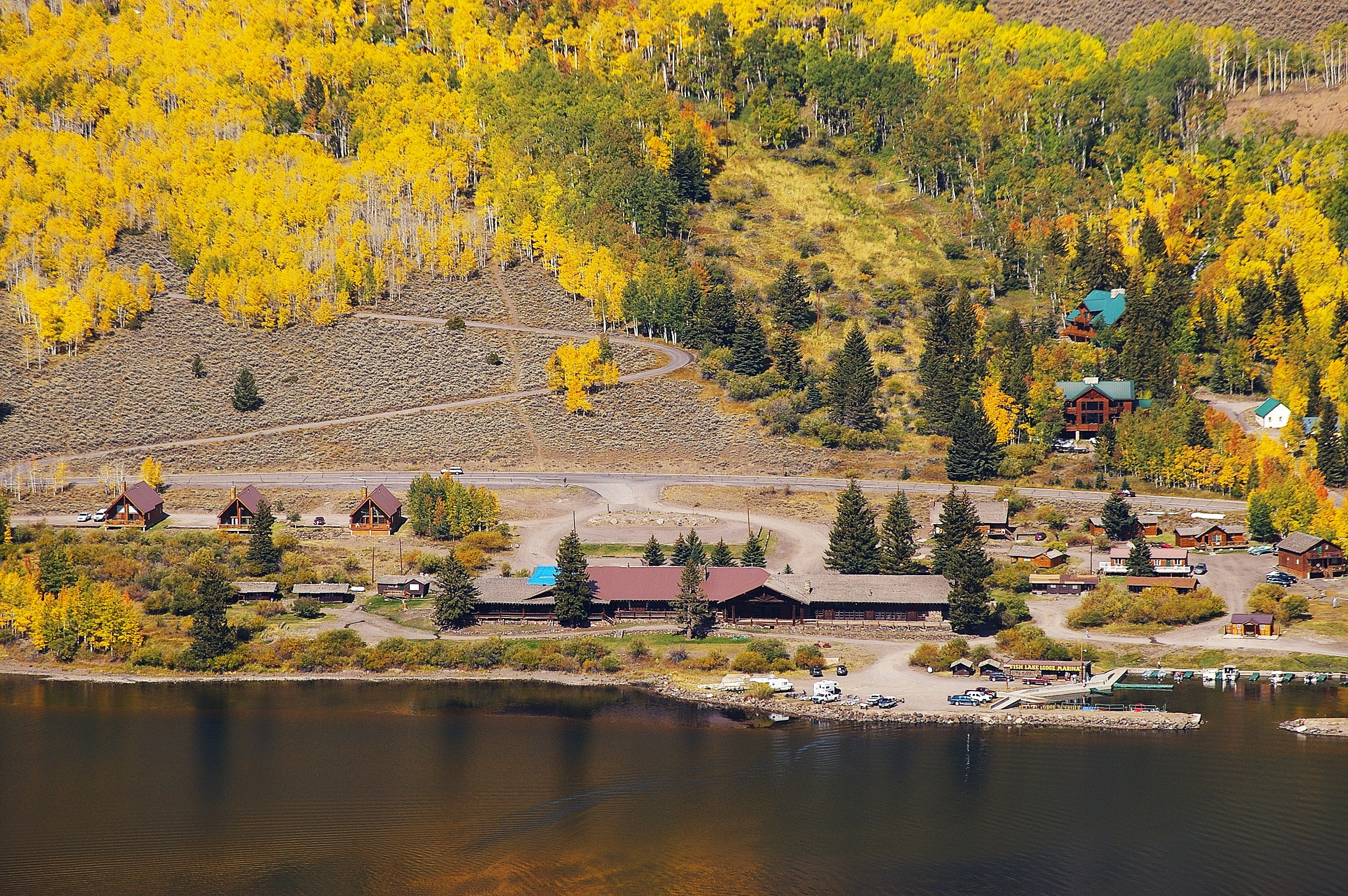
Fish Lake Lodge on the Fishlake Scenic Byway, UT
