= Balykty =

Balykty may refer to:

- Balykty (Jalal-Abad Region), a village in Kyrgyzstan.
- Balykty (Burabay District), a lake in Akmola Region, Kazakhstan.
- Balykty Sarkyl, a lake in West Kazakhstan Region, Kazakhstan.

== See also ==
- Balyktykol
