= List of lakes of Sweet Grass County, Montana =

There are at least 50 named lakes and reservoirs in Sweet Grass County, Montana.

== Lakes ==
- Armour Pond, 45°21′29″N 110°13′04″W, el. 6,102 feet (1,860 m)
- Beley Lakes, 45°58′44″N 110°11′07″W, el. 6,450 feet (1,970 m)
- Blue Lake, 46°02′01″N 110°17′22″W, el. 8,222 feet (2,506 m)
- Blue Lake, 45°11′58″N 110°12′50″W, el. 9,465 feet (2,885 m)
- Burnt Gulch Lake, 45°14′39″N 110°09′00″W, el. 9,078 feet (2,767 m)
- Camp Lake, 45°28′17″N 110°06′56″W, el. 8,983 feet (2,738 m)
- Cascade Lake, 46°03′56″N 110°15′43″W, el. 8,845 feet (2,696 m)
- Chalice Lake, 45°18′53″N 110°03′58″W, el. 9,626 feet (2,934 m)
- Cirque Lake, 45°14′12″N 110°05′07″W, el. 9,032 feet (2,753 m)
- Crazy Lake, 46°00′33″N 110°17′10″W, el. 9,137 feet (2,785 m)
- Divide Creek Lake, 45°22′48″N 110°06′46″W, el. 8,953 feet (2,729 m)
- Emerald Lake, 45°18′01″N 110°12′20″W, el. 9,111 feet (2,777 m)
- Favonius Lake, 45°13′05″N 110°05′56″W, el. 9,426 feet (2,873 m)
- Fish Lake, 45°15′08″N 110°06′36″W, el. 9,475 feet (2,888 m)
- Granite Lake, 46°02′05″N 110°17′37″W, el. 8,205 feet (2,501 m)
- Hidden Lake, 46°01′15″N 110°16′12″W, el. 9,652 feet (2,942 m)
- Horseshoe Lake, 45°16′11″N 110°10′56″W, el. 9,521 feet (2,902 m)
- Jay Lake, 45°18′23″N 110°04′02″W, el. 9,819 feet (2,993 m)
- Jordan Lake, 45°14′08″N 110°04′43″W, el. 8,904 feet (2,714 m)
- Kent Lake, 45°38′36″N 109°36′21″W, el. 4,754 feet (1,449 m)
- Lake Columbine, 45°13′03″N 110°08′43″W, el. 9,153 feet (2,790 m)
- Lake Kathleen, 45°14′24″N 110°11′21″W, el. 7,585 feet (2,312 m)
- Lake Pinchot, 45°16′52″N 110°04′23″W, el. 9,288 feet (2,831 m)
- Lightning Lake, 45°20′05″N 110°04′14″W, el. 9,383 feet (2,860 m)
- Lost Lake, 46°00′15″N 110°16′58″W, el. 8,950 feet (2,730 m)
- Lower Glaston Lake, 45°59′59″N 109°49′57″W, el. 4,659 feet (1,420 m)
- Martes Lake, 45°14′58″N 110°05′10″W, el. 9,409 feet (2,868 m)
- Mirror Lake, 45°16′37″N 110°08′59″W, el. 9,678 feet (2,950 m)
- Moccasin Lake, 45°29′31″N 110°00′25″W, el. 7,513 feet (2,290 m)
- Mouse Lake, 45°12′34″N 110°05′47″W, el. 9,669 feet (2,947 m)
- North Picket Pin Lake, 45°25′51″N 110°02′28″W, el. 8,825 feet (2,690 m)
- Owl Lake, 45°16′33″N 110°06′01″W, el. 9,544 feet (2,909 m)
- Pentad Lake, 45°13′18″N 110°06′12″W, el. 9,399 feet (2,865 m)
- Pipit Lake, 45°16′22″N 110°06′19″W, el. 9,583 feet (2,921 m)
- Rainbow Lakes, 45°16′08″N 110°07′40″W, el. 9,442 feet (2,878 m)
- Rein Lake, 46°10′53″N 110°11′09″W, el. 6,024 feet (1,836 m)
- South Picket Pin Lake, 45°25′31″N 110°02′44″W, el. 9,098 feet (2,773 m)
- Sundown Lake, 45°13′59″N 110°06′12″W, el. 9,495 feet (2,894 m)
- Sunken Rock Lake, 45°14′45″N 110°05′31″W, el. 9,521 feet (2,902 m)
- Swamp Lake, 45°57′59″N 110°16′30″W, el. 8,789 feet (2,679 m)
- Thunder Lake, 46°02′06″N 110°16′59″W, el. 8,061 feet (2,457 m)
- Trout Lake, 45°20′15″N 110°13′47″W, el. 6,155 feet (1,876 m)
- Wounded Man Lake, 45°16′16″N 110°05′05″W, el. 9,258 feet (2,822 m)

== Reservoirs ==
- Beley Pond, 45°52′03″N 109°59′31″W, el. 4,426 feet (1,349 m)
- Glass Lindsay Lakes Lower Reservoir, 46°00′00″N 109°50′09″W, el. 4,659 feet (1,420 m)
- Lake Adam Upper Reservoir, 46°03′42″N 109°48′21″W, el. 4,718 feet (1,438 m)
- Lake Adam Upper Reservoir, 46°03′42″N 109°48′27″W, el. 4,721 feet (1,439 m)
- Lake Adams Upper Reservoir, 46°02′48″N 109°48′33″W, el. 4,705 feet (1,434 m)
- Lavold Reservoir, 45°57′20″N 109°53′18″W, el. 4,363 feet (1,330 m)
- Upper Glaston Lake, 46°02′11″N 109°49′39″W, el. 4,711 feet (1,436 m)

== See also ==
- List of lakes in Montana
