= Hidden Lake (Alaska) =

Lake in the state of Alaska, United States

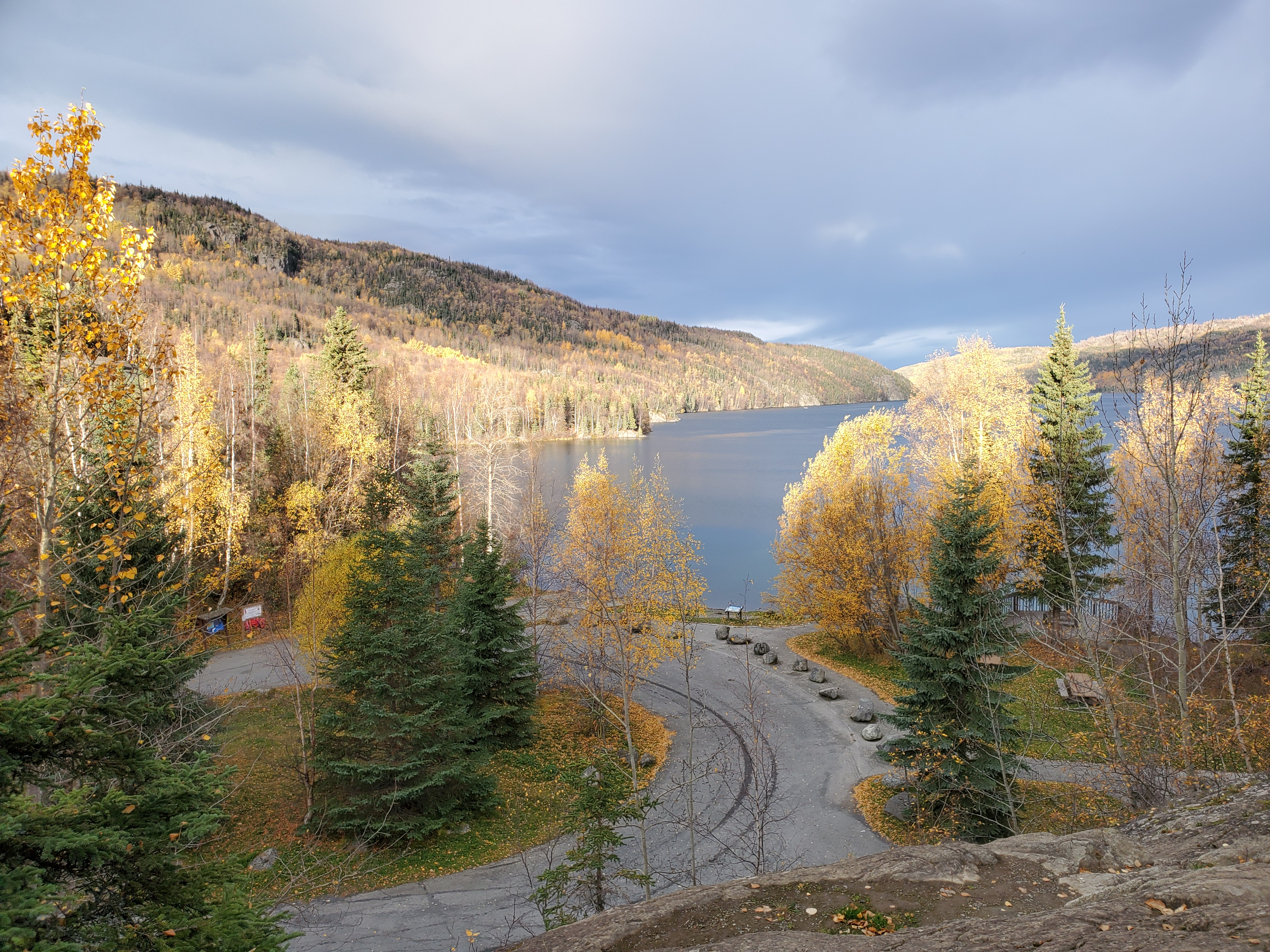
- View from the USFWS campground and boat launch. Only about one-third of the lake is visible from this area, the rest is "hidden" behind islands and rock outcroppings

- Location within Alaska

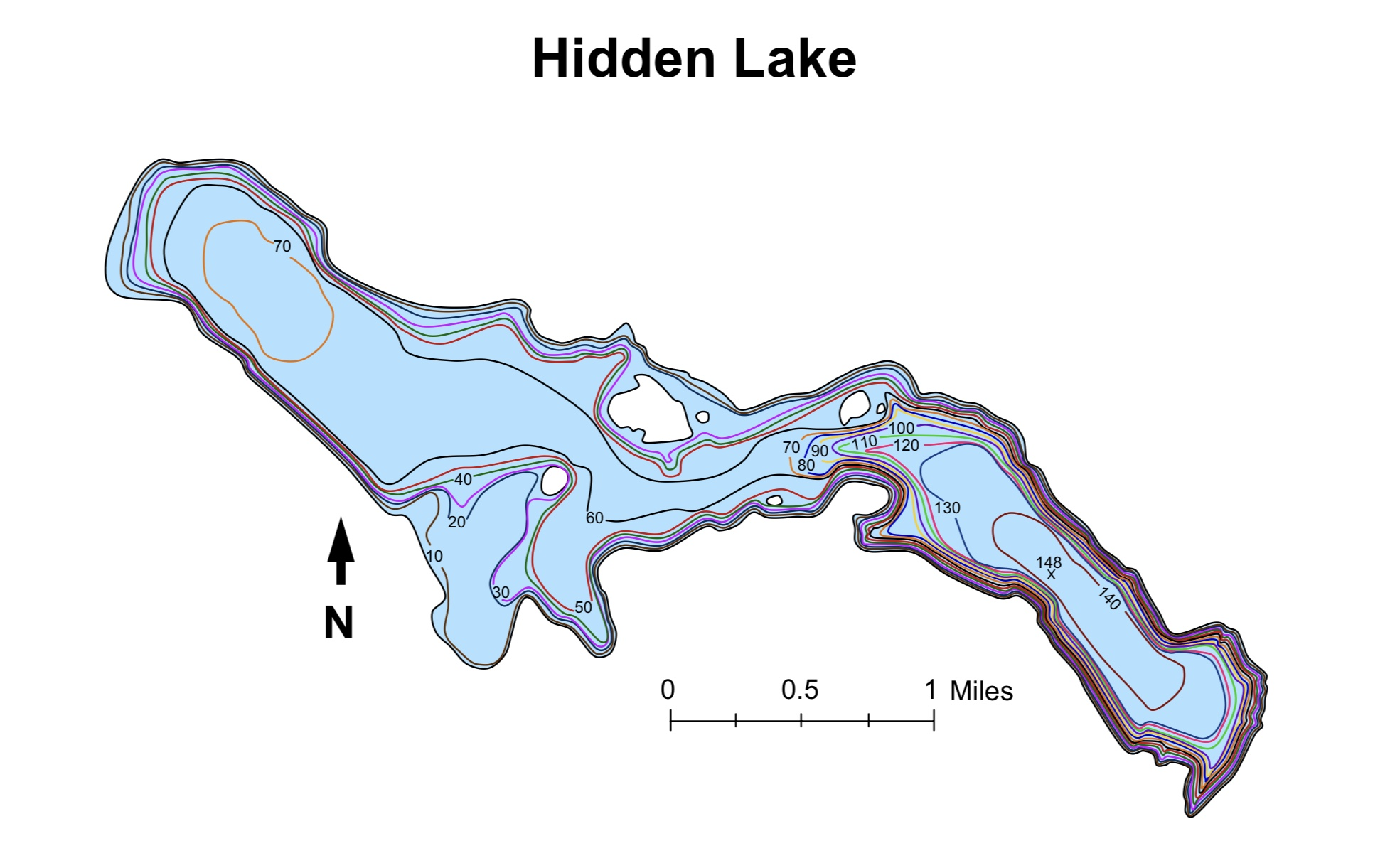
- Location: Kenai National Wildlife Refuge
- Coordinates: 60°29′06″N 150°15′45″W
- Part of: Kenai River system
- Primary inflows: four unnamed creeks
- Primary outflows: Hidden Creek
- Basin countries: United States
- Managing agency: US Fish and Wildlife Service
- Surface area: 682.7 hectares (1,687 acres)
- Average depth: 20.1 meters (66 ft)
- Max. depth: 45.1 meters (148 ft)
- Shore length^{1}: 23,679 feet (7,217 m)
- Surface elevation: 86 meters (282 ft)
- References: http://www.adfg.alaska.gov/SF_Lakes/
- ^{1} Shore length is not a well-defined measure.

Hidden Lake is a lake on the Kenai Peninsula of Alaska, formed by an ancient channel of the Kenai River. It is located entirely inside the Kenai National Wildlife Refuge. The lake is deepest at its southeast end, with depths up to 148 feet (45 m). The back country section of the lake in the northwest has several islands and depths in the range of 10–70 feet (3.0–21.3 m). Being in the foothills of the Kenai Mountains, much of the shoreline is very steep, and wooded with birch and spruce trees. The only outflow from the lake is Hidden Creek, a short, shallow creek that flows into the Kenai River just North of Skilak Lake.

== Access ==
There is a US Fish and Wildlife Service developed campground with 44 campsites and a boat launch at the lake. The campground has handicapped accessibility. It can be accessed via Skilak Lake Road; the only other land access is to the other end of the lake via the Seven Lakes Trail. Airplane landings are only permitted for winter access to ice fishing. The campground was upgraded in 1989. Since the 1990s, campground hosts have been recruited each summer; they live in their own campers or trailers on site and receive a weekly stipend. The 2019 Swan Lake Fire burned some areas on the north shore of the lake, but firefighters were able to save the campground by employing "burnout" strategy, creating a back burn with driptorches alongside the adjacent highway.

== Wildlife ==
The lake and creek are noted for the presence of both brown and black bears. Refuge regulations specify that food, garbage, and other items likely to attract bears be properly stowed in a hard-shelled vehicle or a certified bearproof container at all times when not in immediate use. Other terrestrial mammals include squirrels, weasels, muskrats, and moose. Small birds in the area include jays, thrushes, juncos, warblers, and chickadees. There are also ravens and other corvids as well as bald eagles. Waterfowl commonly spotted in the area include the red-necked grebe, common loon, and Pacific loon.

The lake is home to sockeye salmon that migrate in the tens of thousands, with fry leaving in early June, and spawning adults returning in June and July. Other fish species include Arctic char, coho salmon, lake trout, and rainbow trout.

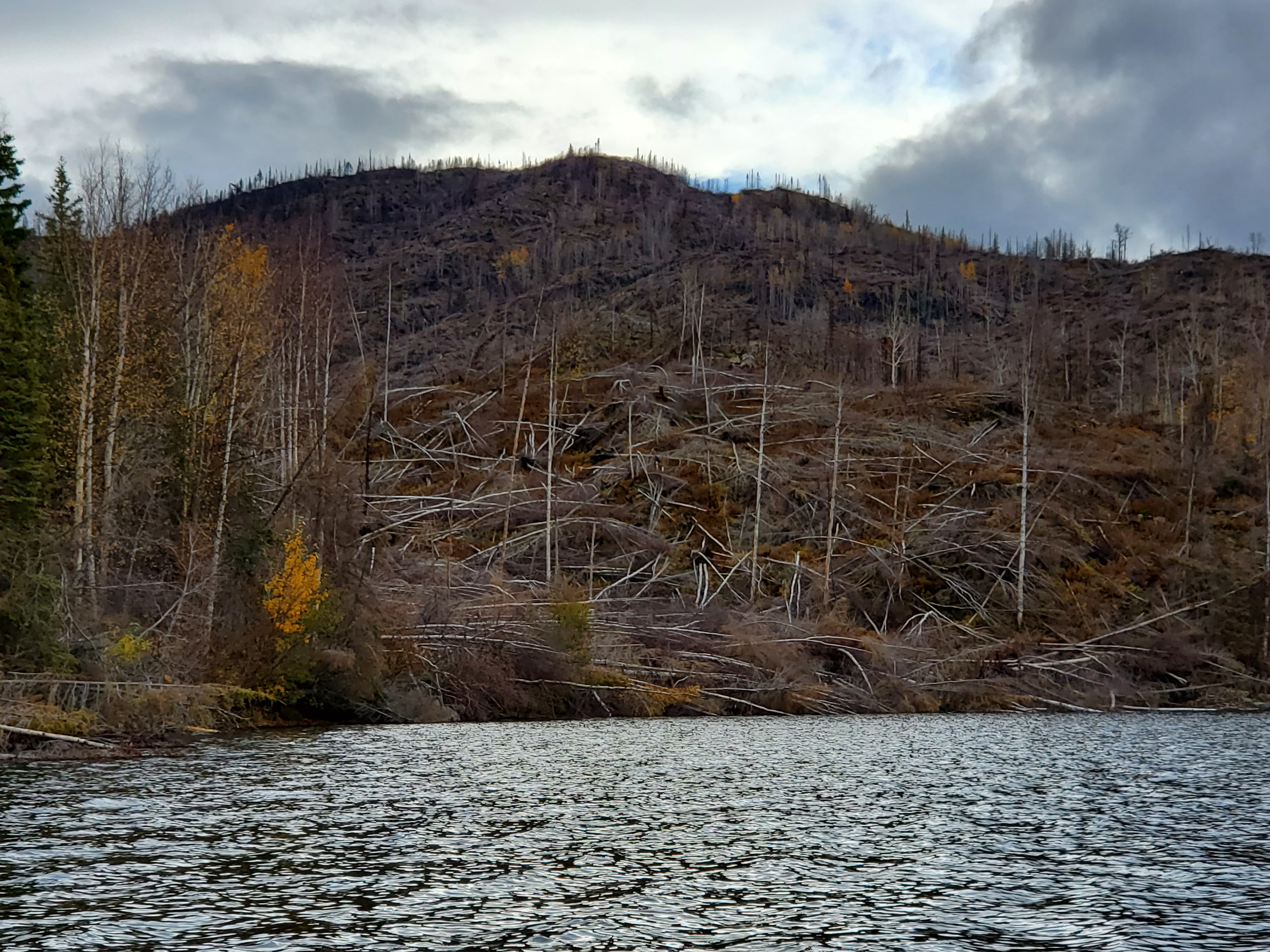
Area of the lake shore partially burned by the Swan Lake Fire
