= Hidden Lakes =

Lake in Gallatin County, Montana

- Location within Montana
- Location: Gallatin County, Montana
- Coordinates: 45.2624°N 111.1720°W
- Type: Lake
- Primary inflows: Gallatin Range
- Primary outflows: Hidden Creek
- Basin countries: United States
- Surface elevation: 9,186 ft (2,800 m)

The Hidden Lakes are a series of eight lakes in Gallatin County, Montana on the west slope of the Gallatin Range in south central Montana. The lakes are located at the head of Hidden Creek, a tributary of Portal Creek in the Gallatin National Forest. The lakes sit east of Windy Pass and south-southeast of Garnet Mountain at an elevation of 9,025 ft (2,751 m).

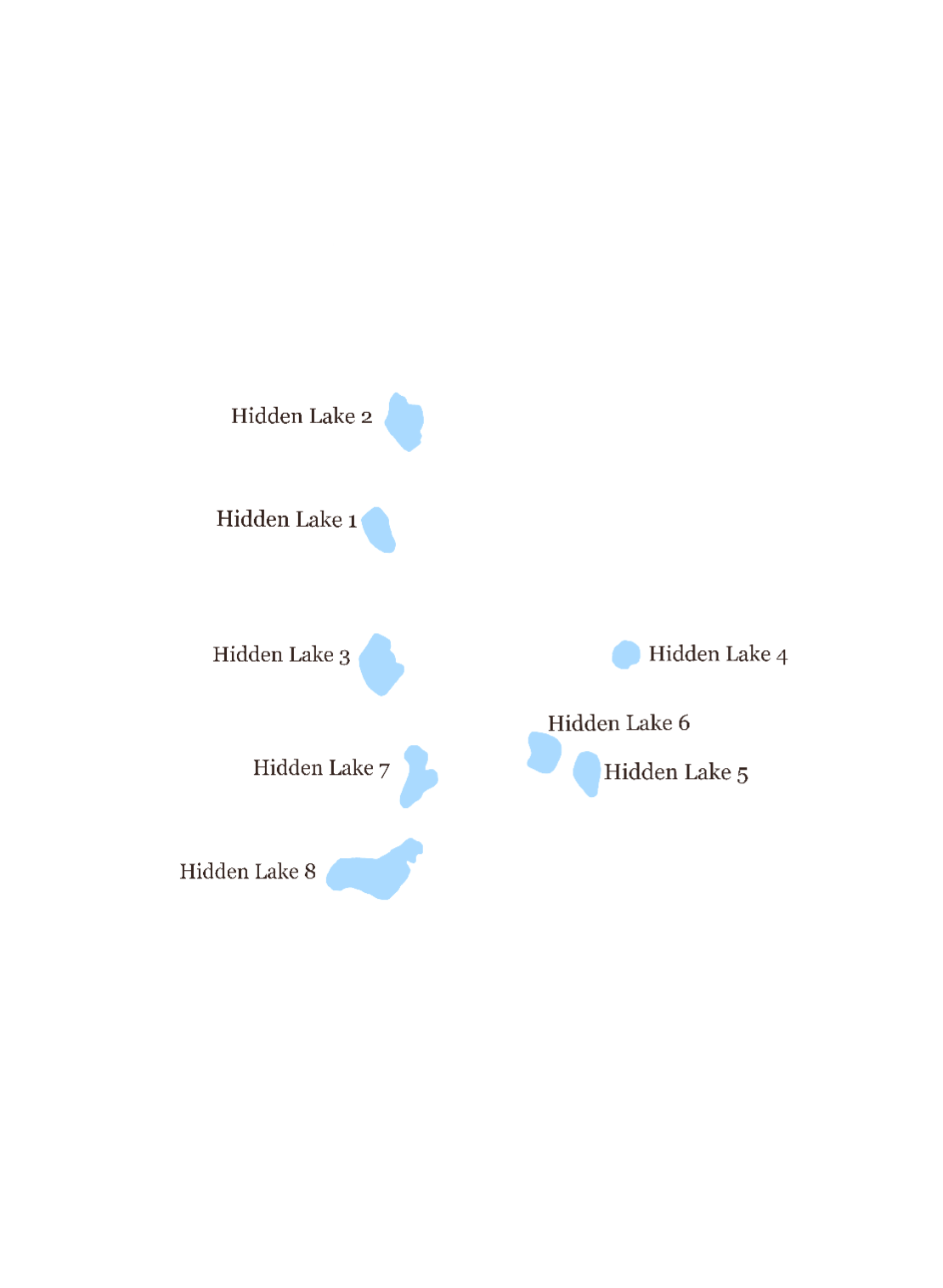
Map of the Hidden Lakes
