= Sundown Lake =

Artificial lake in Iowa, USA

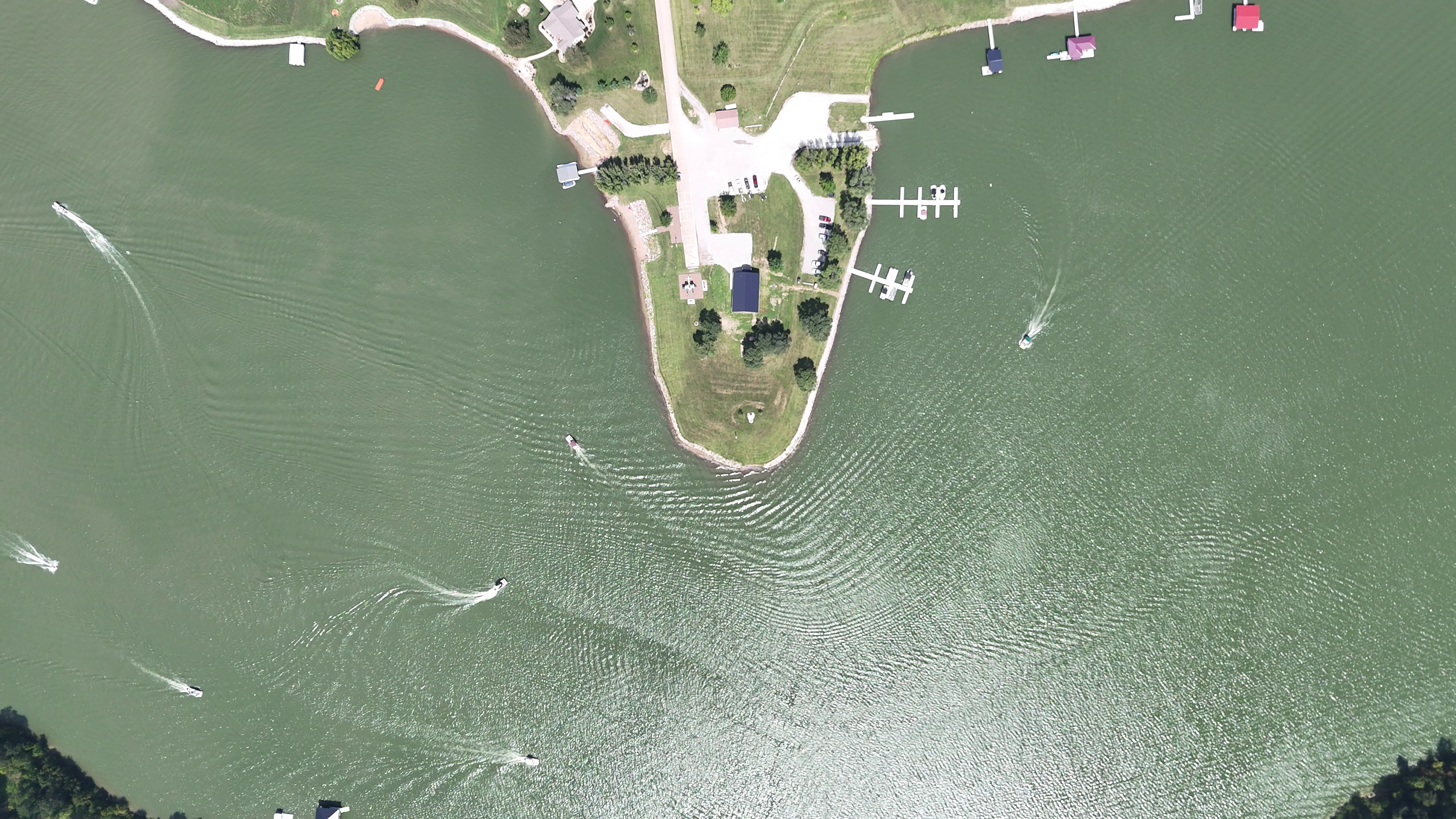
- "The Point", a small peninsula jutting into Sundown Lake

- Location within Iowa Location within the United States
- Location: Appanoose County, Iowa
- Coordinates: 40.833191°N 92.735164°W
- Primary inflows: South Soap Creek
- Primary outflows: South Soap Creek
- Catchment area: 21.7 sq mi (56 km^{2})
- Built: 1976
- Surface area: 400 acres (160 ha)
- Surface elevation: 800 ft (240 m)
- Website: https://www.sundownlake.com/history.html

Sundown Lake is a private, man-made lake in Appanoose County, Iowa, United States, 8 miles (13 km) east of the much larger Rathbun Lake, 2 miles (3.2 km) northwest of Unionville and 7 miles (11 km) southeast of Moravia, Iowa. It was created in 1976, by building a 51 foot tall, 1530 foot long embankment dam on the South Soap Creek, a tributary of the Soap Creek, which is itself a tributary of the Des Moines river. As of 2012, approximately 70 homes had been built in the area surrounding the lake.

Development of the lake began in the 1960s. The lake originally covered about 470 acres, but silting has reduced its size. The cost of the dam and surrounding amenities was $4.5 million.

Sundown Lake is contained within the Sundown Lake Rural Improvement Zone (RIZ), which allows property tax money to be used for maintenance activities (dredging etc.) for the lake. The Appanoose County Board of Supervisors fought unsuccessfully to prevent the establishment of the RIZ, claiming that the diversion of tax revenues would adversely impact schools and local governments. After losing a court battle, the Board of Supervisors approved the creation of the RIZ on June 2, 2014.

The lake is managed by The Coves of Sundown Lake Owners' Association.
