= Fish Lake (Utah) =

Lake in the state of Utah, United States

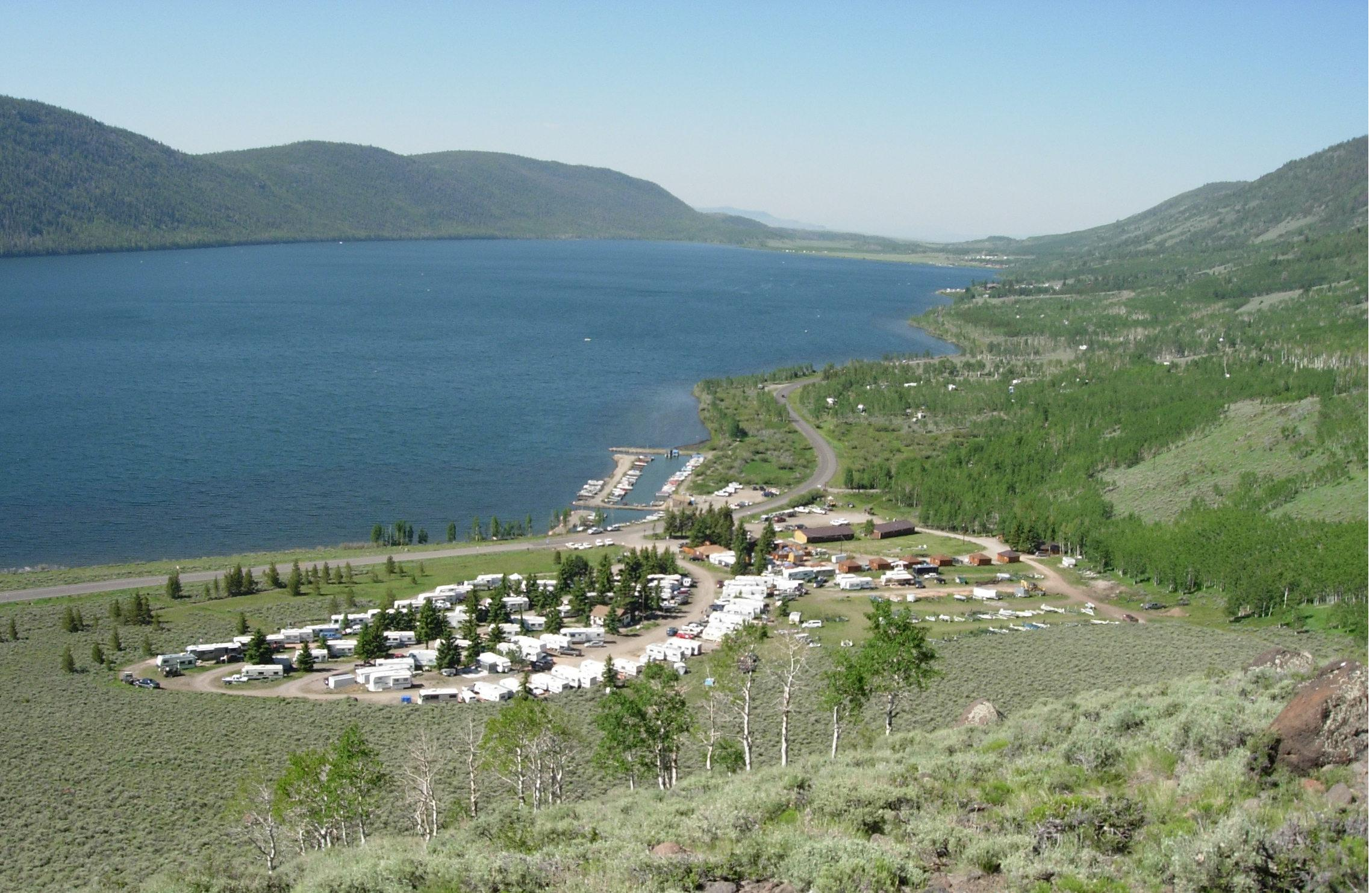
- Bowery Resort in the foreground and the Mytoges to the left

- Location within Utah Location within the United States
- Location: Sevier County, Utah, United States
- Coordinates: 38°32′55″N 111°42′40″W
- Primary inflows: 2535.35
- Basin countries: United States
- Max. length: 5 mi (8.0 km)
- Max. depth: 175 ft (53 m)
- Surface elevation: 8,848 ft (2,697 m)

Fish Lake is a high alpine lake (elevation approximately 8,848 ft or 2,700 m) located in the Fishlake/ Southern Wasatch Plateau region of south-central Utah, United States. It lies within and is the namesake of the Fishlake National Forest.

== Location ==
Fish Lake, six miles long and one mile wide, lies in a geologic structure known as a graben valley. According to the National Forest Foundation, Fish Lake is Utah's largest natural mountain lake. It is bounded by the Mytoge Mountains on the southeast shore which sharply rise about 1,000 feet (300 m) above the lake level. Along the northwest shore, the lake is bounded by Fish Lake Hightop Plateau (summit elevation 11,600 ft / 3,500 m). Hightop Plateau is one of many plateaus that separate the Colorado Plateau interior and the Basin and Range Province.

The nearest town is Koosharem, 15 miles to the west (24 km). A larger community, Richfield, is within a one-hour drive.

== Flora and fauna ==
Pando, a clonal quaking aspen stand, that, according to some sources, is the oldest (80,000 years) and largest (106 acres, 13 million pounds) organism on Earth, is located 1 mile southwest of Fish Lake on Utah route 25. While we can't accurately determine how old Pando is, it's known that this vast, genetically uniform organism, consisting of approximately 47,000 stems (known as ramets), originated from a tiny seed about the size of a pepper grain. Aspen trees regenerate much faster than other trees after a wild fire. After lying dormant while the fire subsides, suckers will sprout above the surface and repopulate the area. These trees have been around for hundreds of years, some even for thousands of years. Not only is Fishlake National Forest home to clonal quaking aspen, but it is densely forested with many species of trees such as Douglas fir, limber pine, ponderosa pine, white fir, pinyon-juniper, and bristlecone pines. The wood of the bristlecone pine trees resist decay for thousands of years. Pinyon pine is one of the more dominant tree species and it tends to be invasive. In 2017 many pinyon pines were removed in the area to improve habitats for birds specifically who rely on grasslands and sage. Plant life consists of a wide range of native and invasive species as well as volcanic rocks.

Fish Lake holds rainbow trout, splake, lake trout, kokanee salmon, brown trout, tiger trout and yellow perch. Yellow perch are regarded as an invasive species; there is no bag limit and anglers are encouraged to dispose of any yellow perch caught. Fish Lake is known for one trophy fish in particular which can grow to be more than 50 pounds, the mackinaw lake trout. The lake is stocked by the Utah Division of Wildlife Resources fish hatchery in Glenwood. Fish Lake is inhabited by more than 150 species of birds and other wildlife such as deer, moose, elk, and mountain goats. The region sees heavy snowfall in the winter, with snowfall occurring as late as June in any given year. For this reason tourist activity is at its peak in the summer months. ATV riding is permitted in 75 miles of Fishlake National Forest.

== Climate ==
The Fish Lake Plateau rises to the northwest of Fish Lake and reaches an elevation of 11,633 ft (3,546 m). Fish Lake Hightop has a subalpine climate (Köppen Dfc), bordering on an alpine climate (Köppen ETH). There is no weather station at the summit, but this climate table contains interpolated data for an area around the summit.

Climate data for Fish Lake Hightop 38.6012 N, 111.7432 W, Elevation: 11,453 ft (3,491 m) (1991–2020 normals)
Month	Jan	Feb	Mar	Apr	May	Jun	Jul	Aug	Sep	Oct	Nov	Dec	Year
Mean daily maximum °F (°C)	28.4 (−2.0)	28.4 (−2.0)	33.4 (0.8)	38.5 (3.6)	47.5 (8.6)	59.3 (15.2)	65.8 (18.8)	63.8 (17.7)	56.7 (13.7)	45.6 (7.6)	35.0 (1.7)	28.1 (−2.2)	44.2 (6.8)
Daily mean °F (°C)	18.6 (−7.4)	17.9 (−7.8)	22.4 (−5.3)	26.9 (−2.8)	35.6 (2.0)	46.3 (7.9)	53.1 (11.7)	51.6 (10.9)	44.7 (7.1)	34.4 (1.3)	24.9 (−3.9)	18.4 (−7.6)	32.9 (0.5)
Mean daily minimum °F (°C)	8.7 (−12.9)	7.4 (−13.7)	11.4 (−11.4)	15.3 (−9.3)	23.7 (−4.6)	33.4 (0.8)	40.5 (4.7)	39.3 (4.1)	32.8 (0.4)	23.2 (−4.9)	14.9 (−9.5)	8.7 (−12.9)	21.6 (−5.8)
Average precipitation inches (mm)	2.81 (71)	2.85 (72)	3.16 (80)	3.31 (84)	2.98 (76)	1.01 (26)	2.00 (51)	2.42 (61)	2.38 (60)	2.37 (60)	2.60 (66)	2.74 (70)	30.63 (777)
Source: PRISM Climate Group
