= Lake Pinchot =

- Location within Montana Location within the United States
- Location: Sweet Grass County, Montana
- Coordinates: 45°16′47″N 110°04′24″W
- Type: lake
- Basin countries: United States
- Surface elevation: 9,288 ft (2,831 m)

Lake Pinchot is a lake in Sweet Grass County, Montana, in the United States.

Lake Pinchot was named in honor of Gifford Pinchot, a park service official.

== See also ==
- List of lakes in Montana
