= Skull Lake =

- Location within Vancouver Island
- Location: Vancouver Island, British Columbia
- Coordinates: 49°03′00″N 125°11′00″W
- Lake type: Natural lake
- Basin countries: Canada

Skull Lake is a lake located on Vancouver Island east of head of Pipestem Inlet and west of Effingham Inlet.

== See also ==
- List of lakes of British Columbia
