= Balyktykol =

Balyktykol (Kazakh: Балықтыкөл; "Fish Lake") may refer to:

- Balyktykol (Karasor Basin), a lake in Karkaraly District, Karaganda Region, Kazakhstan
- Balyktykol (Abai Region), a lake in Zhanasemey District, Abai Region, Kazakhstan
- Balyktykol (Shortandy District), a lake in Akmola Region, Kazakhstan

== See also ==
- Balykty
