= Pando (tree) =

Largest known organism

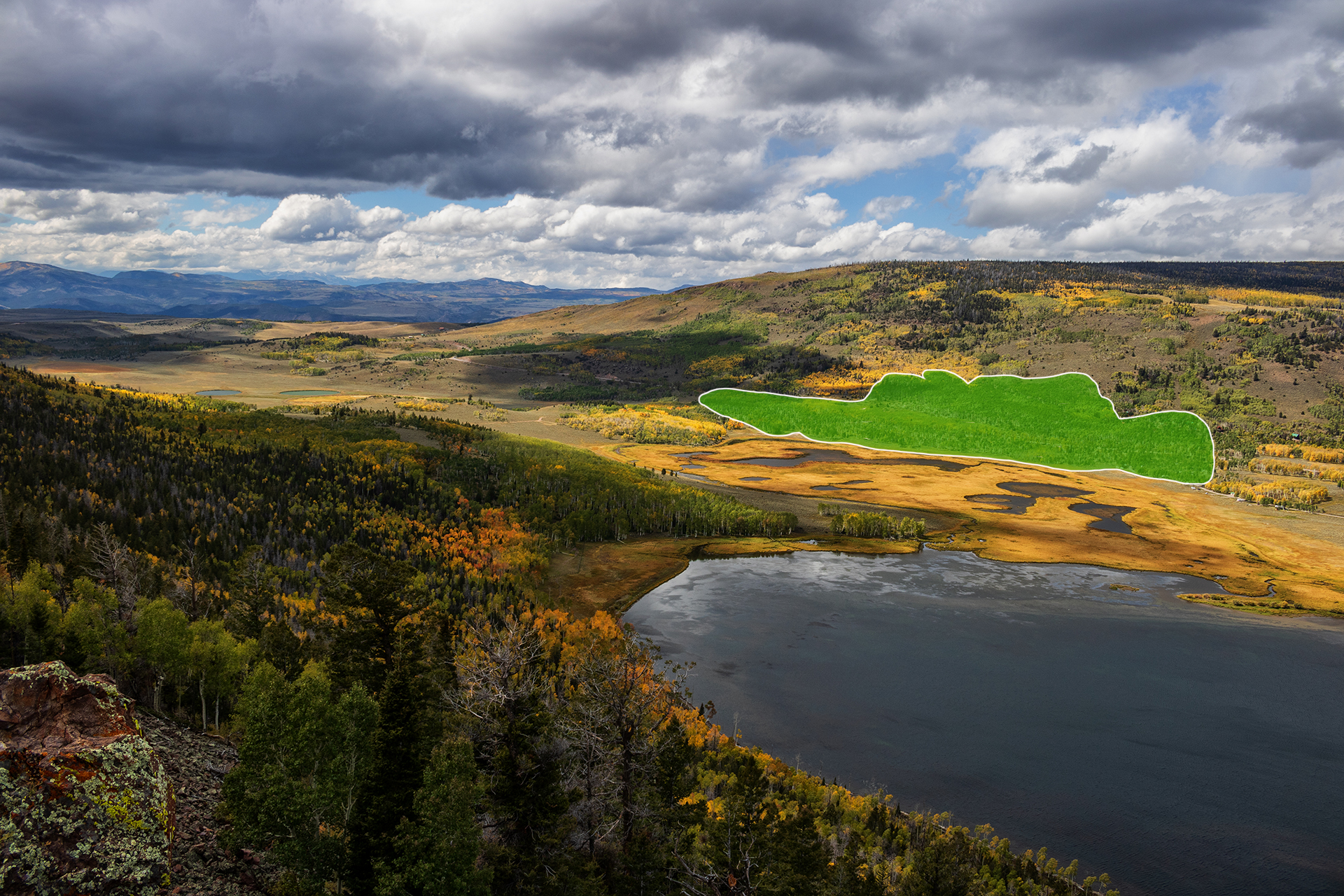
- Image of the approximate land mass of Pando (shaded green)

- Location within Utah Location within the United States

Geography
- Location: Sevier County, Utah, United States
- Coordinates: 38°31′30″N 111°45′00″W
- Elevation: 2,700 m (8,900 ft)
- Area: 43.6 ha (108 acres)

Administration
- Established: +14000; 11974 years' time BP

Ecology
- Dominant tree species: Populus tremuloides

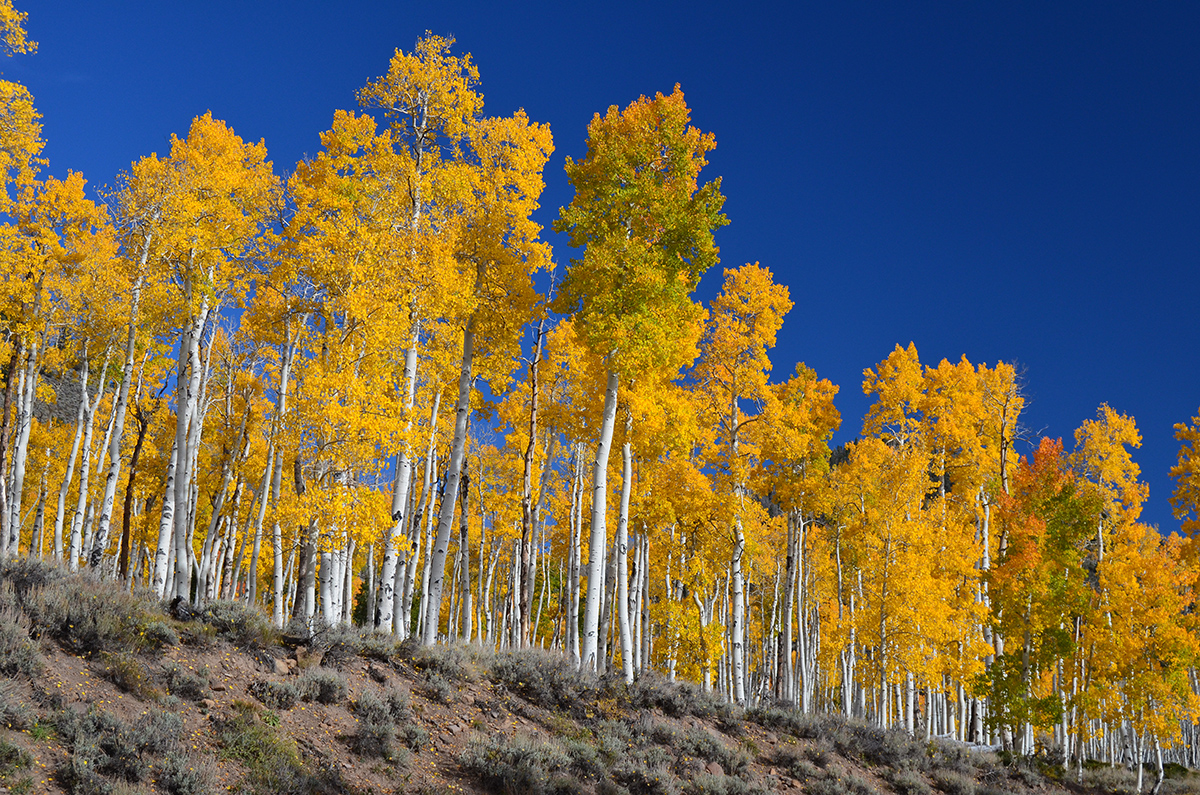
Pando aspen grove at Fishlake National Forest

Pando (from Latin pando 'I spread') is the name of a quaking aspen (Populus tremuloides) clone located in Sevier County, Utah, United States, in the Fishlake National Forest. A male clonal organism, Pando has an estimated 47,000 stems (ramets) that appear to be individual trees but are genetically identical parts of a single tree connected by a root system that spans 42.8 ha (106 acres). As a multi-stem tree, Pando is the world's largest tree by measures of weight, landmass and species.

Systems of classification used to define large trees vary considerably, leading to some confusion about Pando's status. Within the United States, the Official Register of Champion Trees defines the largest trees in a species-specific way; in this case, Pando is the largest aspen tree (Populus tremuloides Michx.). In forestry, the largest trees are measured by the greatest volume of a single stem, regardless of species. In that case, the General Sherman Tree is the largest unitary (single-stem) tree. While many emphasize that Pando is the largest clonal organism, other large trees, including coast redwoods can also reproduce via cloning. Pando being the heaviest tree and the largest tree by landmass, while also being the largest aspen clone, leaves it in a class of its own.

Friends of Pando and the Fishlake National Forest partner to study and protect Pando, working alongside the Utah Division of Wildlife Resources.

== Discovery, naming and verification ==
The Pando tree was identified in 1976 by Jerry Kemperman and Burton V. Barnes. A posthumous biography by Barnes's colleague, Daniel Kashian, details Pando's discovery:

As a part of his aspen work in the West, Burt began to examine an extremely large trembling aspen clone southwest of Fish Lake, Utah, in the late 1960s and early 1970s. Using aerial photography and the same morphological differentiation techniques he developed for aspen at UMBS for his dissertation, Burt concluded that the aspen forest that covered about 106 acres was a single aspen clone, quite possibly the "world's largest organism." Other than a single publication about aspen clone size and another great story to tell his students, Burt's studies on the Fish Lake clone were relatively obscure.

Work by Fishlake National Forest to understand and protect the tree began in 1987, according to interviews and articles written by Fishlake Forest as well as accounts gathered by Friends of Pando. Based on Barnes and Kempermans's 1976 paper noting Pando's discovery, Michael Grant, Jeffrey Mitton, and Yan Linhart of the University of Colorado at Boulder re-examined the clone in 1992 and described Pando as a single male aspen clone based on its morphological characteristics such as pollen production, leaves, and root structure. Michael Grant named the tree "Pando" which is Latin for "I spread" in an editorial published in Discover Magazine. The article was entitled "The Trembling Giant"---which is not the name of the tree, but the title of the article. A large-scale genetic sampling and analysis was published in 2008 by Jennifer DeWoody, Karen Mock, Valerie Hipkins, and Carol Rowe. The research team's genetic study confirmed morphological analysis by Barnes and Kemperman as well as Mitton, Grant and Linhart, thus verifying Pando's size and scale of operation.

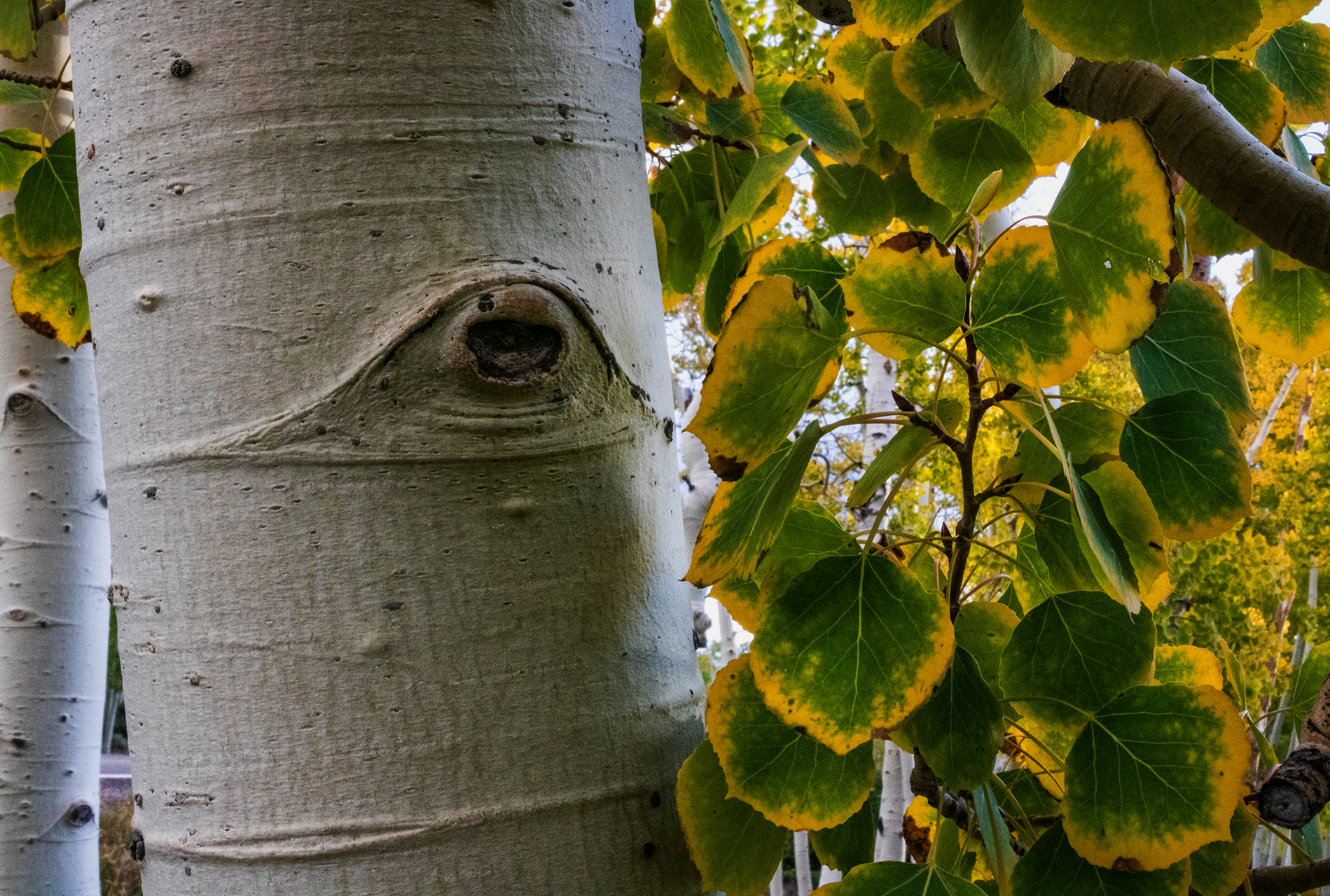
Closeup of a Pando trunk with early autumn colors.

== Research and protection ==
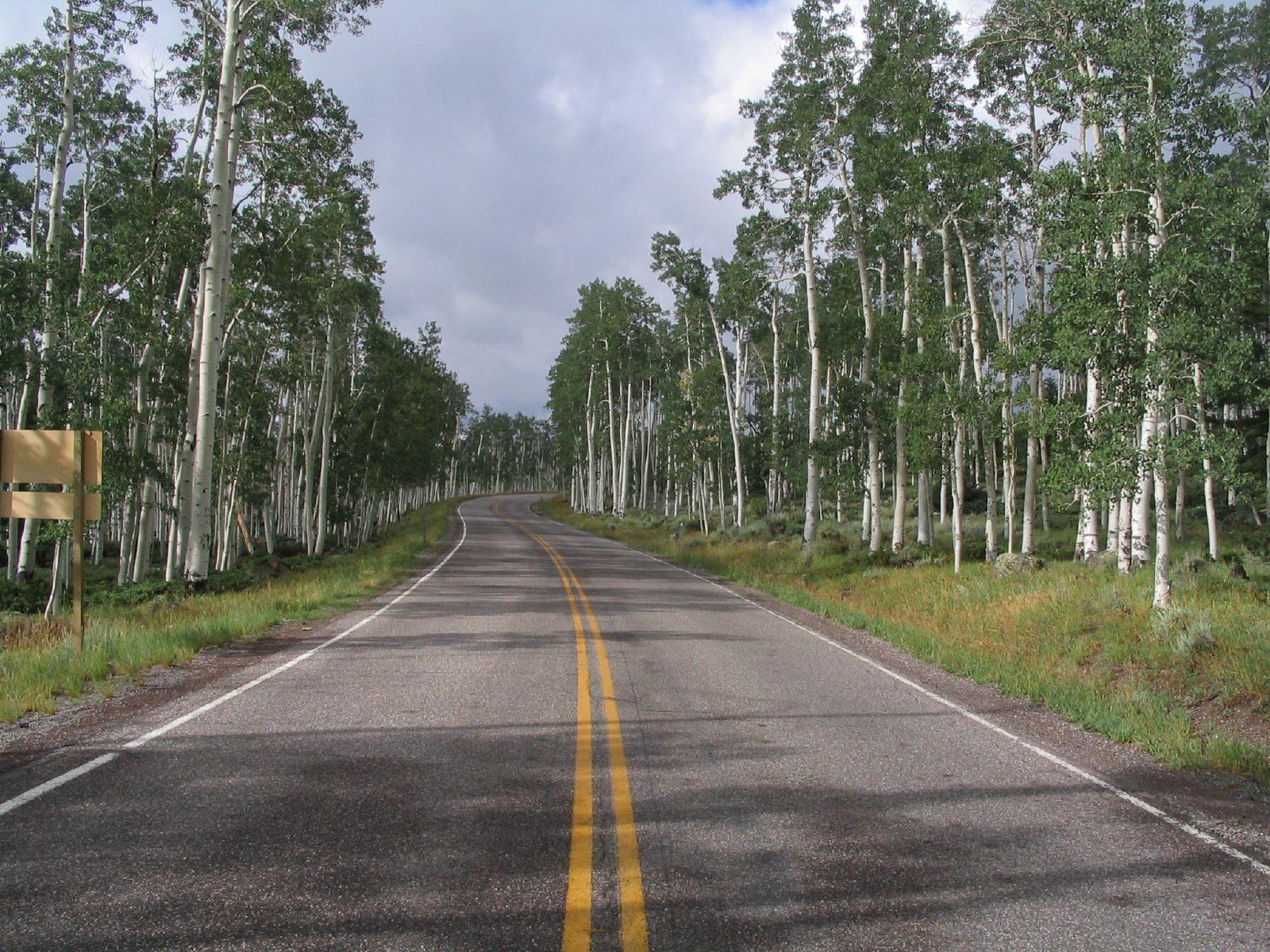
Utah State Route 25, with Pando's trunks on both sides of the road.

In late 1987, Fishlake National Forest began work to remove diseased trees and promote new growth using coppicing (a form of mechanical stimulation), which works by removing diseased stems, that in turn, stimulates a regenerative hormone response in the root which spurs new growth. In 1993, Fishlake National Forest began work on the "Aspen Regeneration Project", installing wildlife control fences to help control deer and elk who threatened to destroy the productive results of work to spur and protect new growth. Today, approximately 80% of the acres covered by Pando is protected by 8-foot wildlife control fences, which work to control populations of mule deer (Odocoileus hemionus) and elk (Cervus canadensis) who can destroy new growth before it can mature if their populations are not kept in check. Thanks to the work of community leaders, using two simplified wildlife management bulwarks to move animals around the tree's landmass, showed early success in 2025 with a 35% reduction in Mule Deer activity around Pando, and a 65% reduction in Elk activity around the tree

Since the early 2000s, little information has been adequately corroborated about Pando's origins and how its genetic integrity has been sustained over a long period of time, conservatively between 9,000 and 16,000 years old by a 2024 estimate. Researchers have argued that Pando's future is uncertain due to a combination of factors including drought, cattle grazing, and fire suppression. In terms of drought, Pando's long-lived nature suggests it has survived droughts that have driven out human societies for centuries at a time. In terms of grazing, a majority of Pando's land mass is fenced for permanent protection and as a unique natural wonder. Cattle grazing ended in Pando in 2024, but previously, was permitted on a volume basis for 10 days a year in October, weather permitting, in a small edge of Pando's southeastern expanse. Additionally, between 2015 and 2022, the local grazers group, 7-Mile Grazers Association, who rely on Pando's forage and biomass to sustain the larger Fish Lake landscape, signed off on a long-term protection plan working with Fishlake National Forest and Friends of Pando, and also wrote letters of support for the "Pando Protection Plan", a plan to bring nearly 34 hectares (84 acres) of the tree into protective care. In terms of fire suppression, research indicates Pando has survived fires that would have likely leveled the tree many times, after which Pando regenerated itself from the root system. The same research also indicates large-scale fire events are infrequent, which may be owed to the fact that aspens are water-heavy trees and thus, naturally fire resistant, earning them the name "asbestos forests" among wildfire scientists. These concerns aside, there is a broad consensus that wildlife controls to protect Pando from overbrowsing by deer and elk are critical to its sustainability and care. Protection systems, coupled with ongoing monitoring and restoration efforts, have been shown to be effective since the late 1980s and early 1990s, with new projects underway.

Historically, regeneration rates in portions of the "Aspen Regeneration Project" which started in the 1990s, showed promise based on photographic evidence and repeated survey plots by land managers, scientists and conservation groups between 1993 and today. Despite this, many have argued more work needs to be done to control wildlife, as the Pando Tree is surrounded by 700 square miles of de facto wildlife preserve managed by people, groups and agencies who do not have Pando's sustainability as a central concern in their land management policies. Paul Rogers and Darren McAvoy of Utah State University completed an assessment of Pando's status in 2018 and stressed the importance of reducing herbivory by mule deer and elk as critical to conserving Pando. In 2023, a team of researchers, land managers, wildlife biologists, and citizen scientist groups began long-term programs to monitor deer and elk using GPS collars and wildlife cameras to better understand wildlife and use that data to better care for Pando and understand wildlife that rely on it. In 2022, Executive Order 14702 directed the US Forest Service to inventory old growth and mature forest as part of a plan to protect mature and old growth forest. Data submitted by Fishlake National Forest defined Pando's landmass as "mature," meaning it could be eligible for special care and protections.

=== 2024 Pando Protection Plan ===
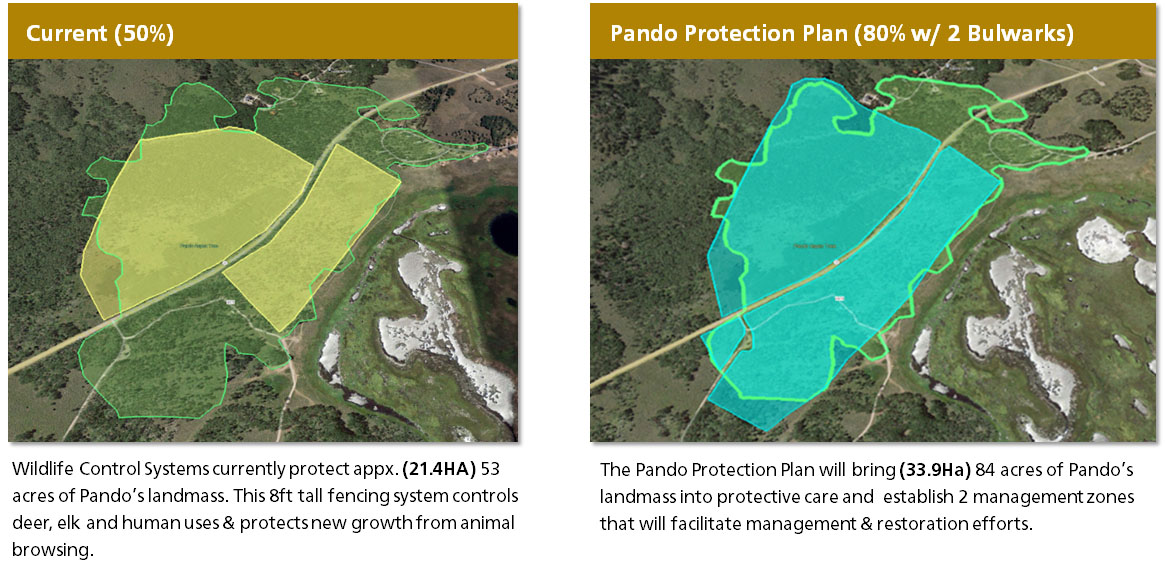
Map information showing previous and planned protection project of the Pando Tree.

Between 2015 and 2022, Fishlake National Forest, Pando's federal land stewards, developed a plan and gathered public feedback for work to expand wildlife controls and protections of the Pando Tree as part of the Fishlake Basin Recreation Improvement Plan. Work to develop the plan involved gathering formal and informal feedback from community, regional, and state organizations in Land Management, Agriculture, Conservation, and Recreation between 2015 and 2019, followed by a public comment period which ran from March 2021 through March 2022. The plan was approved in June 2022 by Fishlake National Forest Supervisor Michael Elson. In 2023, Friends of Pando worked to gather letters of support for the plan and was invited by Representative Carl Albrecht to give a brief presentation about the plan to the Utah Legislature.(PDF of Presentation) Based on recommendations and community support, Representative Albrecht secured a $250,000 allocation for the Utah Department of Transportation to develop plans and contract work to expand wildlife controls to bring the majority of Pando's landmass into protective care. Between May 2024 and September 2024, Friends of Pando and community organizations worked to organize a series of talks and meetings to finalize the plan. Based on wildlife behavior data gathered by Friends of Pando, Fishlake National Forest and Utah Division of Wildlife Resources the final plan was mapped to maximize wildlife management in and around the tree. Work was completed in September of 2025.

== Size and age ==
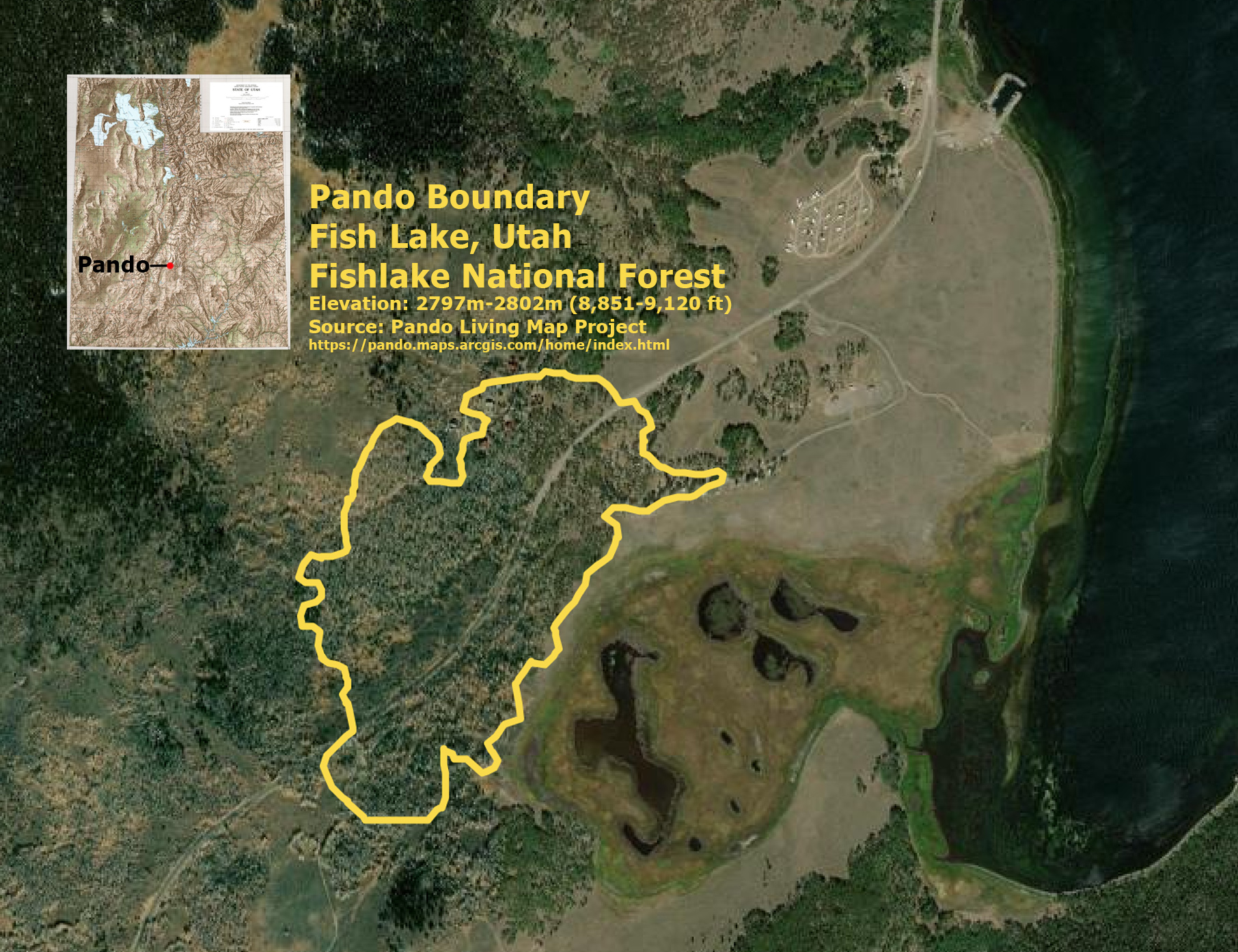
Boundary Map of Pando

Based on Barnes's work and later work, it has been estimated that Pando encompasses 42.89 hectares (106 acres), weighs an estimated 6,000 metric tons (6,600 short tons) or 13.2 million pounds, and features an estimated 47,000 stems, which die individually and are replaced by genetically identical stems that are sent up from the tree's vast root system, a process known as "suckering".

Mitton and Grant summarize the development of stems in aspen clones:

...quaking aspen regularly reproduces via a process called suckering. An individual stem can send out lateral roots that, under the right conditions, send up other erect stems; from all above-ground appearances the new stems look just like individual trees. The process is repeated until a whole stand, of what appear to be individual trees, forms. This collection of multiple stems, called ramets, all form one, single, genetic individual, usually termed a clone.

The root system is estimated to be several thousand years old, with habitat modeling suggesting a maximum age of 14,000 years while climate data and studies on optimal growing conditions for Aspen seeds to germinate, and then begin to sucker indicates it likely could not be any older than 16,000 years old by the latest (2024) estimate. Individual stems do not typically live more than 130–150 years, somewhat longer lived than aspen state wide. Pando's landmass spreads from 2,700 m (8,900 ft) above sea level to approximately 2,813 m (9,230 ft) above sea level along the western side of a steep basin wall. At its greatest extent, it spans 0.67 miles by 0.45 miles, and represents 10.4% of the landmass of the Fish lake Basin, which is dominated by Fish Lake itself and is also the largest mountain freshwater lake in Utah, and the largest freshwater source in the area.

=== Range of age estimates ===
Due to the progressive replacement of stems and roots, the overall age of an aspen clone cannot be determined from tree rings. Speculations on Pando's age have ranged between 80,000 and 1 million years. Many news sources list Pando's age as 80,000 years, but this claim derives from a now-removed National Park Service web page, which redacted that claim in 2023 and was inconsistent with the Forest Service's post ice-age estimate. Glaciers repeatedly formed on the Fish Lake Plateau over the past several hundred thousand years and the mountains above Pando's landmass were crowned by glaciers as recently as the last glacial maximum.

Ages greater than approximately 16,000 years therefore require Pando to have survived climate conditions during the Pinedale glaciation, something that appears unlikely under current estimates of Pando's age and modeling of variations in local average temperature and climate. According to multiple studies, in order for the Pando seed to germinate, would have required soil temperatures of at least 59 °F (15 °C) while soil temperatures of at least 74 °F (23 °C) would be needed for suckering to begin and for Pando to have spread. During the time glaciers were present in the area, temperature models indicate Pando's homeland would have been 7‒25 °F (4‒14 °C) cooler, with the warmest month, July, which today has an average temperature of 74 °F (23 °C) for the high, and 44 °F (7 °C) for the low. A 2017 paper by Chen Ding et al. seems to support US Forest Service claims that Pando could not be older than the last Glacial Maximum in the area based on paleo-climate models and genetic traits of aspen sites throughout North America. A 2024 paper by Pineau et at first indicated the age could be between 16,000 and 80,000 years based on the first somatic mutation model of the tree, but, that research did not pass peer review, while mass media outlets continue to push an unverified claim. A revised draft by the researcher in 2026 tacked the age at between 16,000 years old and upwards of 37,000 years old, but again, did not pass peer review making it hard to situate the claims. Thus, charcoal studies published in 2022 place the lower end of Pando's potential age range at around 9,000 years, while the somatic mutation models' most conservative estimate, which seems climatically and geologically possible rest at 16,000 years meaning, Pando is likely at least 9,000 years old, and no more than 16,000 years old based on the best methods we have today.

== In popular culture ==
- In 2006, the United States Postal Service published a stamp in commemorating Pando which was designed by artist Lonnie Busch, calling it one of the forty "Wonders of America".
- In 2013, Pando featured as the backdrop and the subject of a music video for a successful campaign led by 4th graders of nearby Monroe, Utah, United States, to have the State of Utah's Tree be changed from Colorado Spruce to the Quaking Aspen. The song the children sang was written by Utah folk artist and songwriter, Clive Romney.
- In 2018, the Pando Aspen Clone figures as a central figure in the life of the character Patricia Westerford in Richard Powers' novel The Overstory.
- In 2021, children's book author Kate Allen Fox published "Pando: A Living Wonder of Trees" earning her a School Library Journal Award for the work.
- In 2022, an episode of NBC TV Show "The Blacklist" entitled "The Trembling Giant" (a nickname for Pando) features a scene where central character Raymond 'Red' Reddington details the tree's operation.
- In 2022, Friends of Pando published audio works by sound conservationist and artist Jeff Rice documenting the tree's subterranean workings for the first time.
- In 2022, Pando was the subject of an issue of the webcomic xkcd published on December 23, which facetiously suggests adding to Pando's many world records that of world's largest Christmas tree by running a 9,300-foot-long string of Christmas lights through the branches along its perimeter.
- In 2024, the Hallmark Channel had a movie titled Branching Out, set in Utah, in which a young girl searches for the paternal side of her family, as her mom had used a donor for an IVF conception. The girl's mom and the donor fall in love. At the film's conclusion, as the girl presents her "family tree" project to her class, she explains her family tree is a Pando, as the newfound family and her are all interconnected, like the Pando tree.
- In 2024, Intel Computer Chip Corporation named a novel quantum computing control chip "Pando Tree". While many technology organizations have utilized "Pando" in terms of its Latin meaning for "spread", the naming is the first to explicitly honor the Pando Tree itself.
- In the 2024 book Beautyland by Marie-Helene Bertino, the main character Adina learns about the Pando Tree, which serves as a symbol of connection and resilience, large things that are one thing, and her unfolding role as a planetary traveler with unique powers and skills.
- A 2025 comic by AWA Studios, "Entanglement" written by Joshua Lak Kim & Ciara Ni Chuirc, place the Pando Tree at the center of a utopian sci-fi family drama revolving around the development of renewable energy.
- On January 20, 2026, Composer Nancy Ives gave the world premier of her composition the "Quaking Giant".The work, performed by the Pyxis Quartet of the Portland School (Oregon) hosted by the 45th Parallel Universe music collective.

== See also ==
- Auxin
- Basal shoot
- Cytokinins
- Largest organisms
- List of individual trees
- List of oldest trees
- Posidonia australis
- Rhizome
- Vegetative reproduction
