= High Lake =

Lake in the state of South Dakota, United States

- Location within South Dakota Location within the United States
- Location: Marshall County, South Dakota
- Coordinates: 45°48′58″N 97°25′52″W
- Type: Lake
- Basin countries: United States
- Surface area: 80 acres (32 ha)
- Surface elevation: 1,965 ft (599 m)

High Lake is a natural spring-fed lake in Marshall County, South Dakota within the Lake Traverse Indian Reservation.

High Lake earned its name as it is located at the top of a 600m plateau.
