= List of lakes of Ravalli County, Montana =

There are at least 126 named lakes and reservoirs in Ravalli County, Montana.

== Lakes ==
- Aichele Lake, 46°19′46″N 114°21′55″W, el. 7,953 feet (2,424 m)
- Alpine Lakes, 45°52′52″N 113°34′27″W, el. 7,949 feet (2,423 m)
- Bailey Lake, 46°07′56″N 114°28′27″W, el. 6,470 feet (1,970 m)
- Baker Lake, 45°53′31″N 114°15′46″W, el. 7,854 feet (2,394 m)
- Bear Lake, 46°26′10″N 114°21′03″W, el. 6,581 feet (2,006 m)
- Big Creek Lakes, 46°29′28″N 114°21′56″W, el. 5,869 feet (1,789 m)
- Big Grizzly Lake, 46°02′07″N 114°29′22″W, el. 7,080 feet (2,160 m)
- Boulder Lake, 45°51′42″N 114°23′33″W, el. 7,090 feet (2,160 m)
- Bryan Lake, 46°25′12″N 114°22′41″W, el. 6,778 feet (2,066 m)
- Buck Lake, 45°52′07″N 113°39′48″W, el. 6,945 feet (2,117 m)
- Burnt Fork Lake, 46°18′05″N 113°50′24″W, el. 7,247 feet (2,209 m)
- Burrell Lake, 45°35′40″N 114°05′18″W, el. 8,117 feet (2,474 m)
- Camas Lake, 46°09′22″N 114°16′49″W, el. 6,936 feet (2,114 m)
- Canyon Lake, 46°14′42″N 114°19′56″W, el. 7,303 feet (2,226 m)
- Capri Lake, 45°43′54″N 114°05′32″W, el. 6,614 feet (2,016 m)
- Carmine Lake, 45°50′50″N 113°41′28″W, el. 7,992 feet (2,436 m)
- Cave Lake, 45°54′13″N 114°17′54″W, el. 7,539 feet (2,298 m)
- Chaffin Lake, 45°56′27″N 114°20′15″W, el. 7,510 feet (2,290 m)
- Charity Lake, 46°01′06″N 113°45′30″W, el. 7,953 feet (2,424 m)
- Dollar Lake, 45°51′53″N 114°22′38″W, el. 7,237 feet (2,206 m)
- East Lake, 46°14′43″N 114°19′27″W, el. 7,228 feet (2,203 m)
- Elk Lake, 46°02′59″N 114°26′42″W, el. 5,689 feet (1,734 m)
- Esplin Lake, 45°47′34″N 114°29′20″W, el. 6,945 feet (2,117 m)
- Faith Lake, 46°00′52″N 113°45′00″W, el. 7,749 feet (2,362 m)
- Fish Lake, 46°06′09″N 114°27′27″W, el. 6,703 feet (2,043 m)
- Fish Lake, 46°00′20″N 113°44′27″W, el. 7,385 feet (2,251 m)
- Fool Hen Lake, 46°16′23″N 113°52′45″W, el. 7,356 feet (2,242 m)
- Frog Pond Lake, 45°41′05″N 114°01′05″W, el. 7,267 feet (2,215 m)
- Garrard Lake, 46°19′34″N 114°21′15″W, el. 7,195 feet (2,193 m)
- Gem Lake, 45°53′38″N 114°16′42″W, el. 8,346 feet (2,544 m)
- Glen Lake, 46°27′10″N 114°17′14″W, el. 7,543 feet (2,299 m)
- Goat Lake, 45°59′00″N 114°21′19″W, el. 7,090 feet (2,160 m)
- Hackney Lake, 46°04′56″N 114°26′45″W, el. 6,988 feet (2,130 m)
- Hart Lake, 45°56′50″N 114°19′19″W, el. 7,339 feet (2,237 m)
- Hauf Lake, 46°17′44″N 114°19′19″W, el. 7,310 feet (2,230 m)
- Heinrich Lake, 46°18′49″N 114°25′12″W, el. 7,267 feet (2,215 m)
- Hidden Lake, 46°27′59″N 114°18′54″W, el. 7,142 feet (2,177 m)
- Hidden Lake, 45°56′08″N 113°31′38″W, el. 8,225 feet (2,507 m)
- Hope Lake, 45°51′24″N 113°36′15″W, el. 7,858 feet (2,395 m)
- Hope Lake, 46°01′00″N 113°45′15″W, el. 7,877 feet (2,401 m)
- Ingomar Lake, 46°13′01″N 114°24′14″W, el. 6,863 feet (2,092 m)
- Jerry Lake, 46°06′37″N 113°46′04″W, el. 7,664 feet (2,336 m)
- Jerusalem Lake, 45°48′46″N 114°27′13″W, el. 7,592 feet (2,314 m)
- Kelly Lake, 45°56′25″N 113°33′28″W, el. 8,025 feet (2,446 m)
- Kent Lake, 46°03′33″N 113°48′03″W, el. 7,782 feet (2,372 m)
- Kerlee Lake, 45°59′12″N 114°21′38″W, el. 6,998 feet (2,133 m)
- Kidney Lake, 46°09′03″N 114°17′05″W, el. 7,346 feet (2,239 m)
- Knaack Lake, 46°19′52″N 114°21′41″W, el. 7,513 feet (2,290 m)
- Kneaves Lake, 46°16′39″N 113°52′16″W, el. 7,392 feet (2,253 m)
- Kock Lake, 46°04′58″N 114°23′18″W, el. 7,224 feet (2,202 m)
- Kramis Pond, 46°04′03″N 114°14′45″W, el. 4,298 feet (1,310 m)
- Lake Capitan, 46°00′52″N 114°27′37″W, el. 6,388 feet (1,947 m)
- Lake Crystal, 45°51′34″N 114°22′47″W, el. 7,716 feet (2,352 m)
- Lake of the Rocks, 45°51′19″N 114°20′52″W, el. 7,769 feet (2,368 m)
- Lake Turbid, 45°51′30″N 114°22′31″W, el. 7,693 feet (2,345 m)
- Lappi Lake, 46°34′17″N 114°14′25″W, el. 6,991 feet (2,131 m)
- Little Burnt Fork Lakes, 46°17′14″N 113°49′20″W, el. 7,280 feet (2,220 m)
- Little Grizzly Lake, 46°02′15″N 114°29′44″W, el. 7,067 feet (2,154 m)
- Little Rock Creek Lake, 46°01′27″N 114°20′26″W, el. 6,548 feet (1,996 m)
- Lockwood Lake, 46°19′06″N 114°25′04″W, el. 7,467 feet (2,276 m)
- Lomo Lake, 46°14′51″N 114°22′46″W, el. 7,018 feet (2,139 m)
- Lookout Lake, 46°04′15″N 114°27′20″W, el. 7,057 feet (2,151 m)
- Lost Horse Lake, 46°05′06″N 114°25′19″W, el. 7,129 feet (2,173 m)
- Middle Fork Lakes, 46°33′04″N 114°19′36″W, el. 5,984 feet (1,824 m)
- Middle Lake, 45°53′31″N 114°16′31″W, el. 8,179 feet (2,493 m)
- Milepost Lake, 46°02′23″N 114°29′59″W, el. 6,991 feet (2,131 m)
- Mills Lake, 46°38′14″N 114°15′57″W, el. 7,812 feet (2,381 m)
- Mink Lake, 45°53′14″N 114°20′02″W, el. 7,798 feet (2,377 m)
- Mud Lake, 46°09′43″N 114°28′25″W, el. 8,307 feet (2,532 m)
- Mudhole Lake, 45°46′43″N 114°26′34″W, el. 5,748 feet (1,752 m)
- Nelson Lake, 45°49′55″N 114°21′25″W, el. 7,264 feet (2,214 m)
- North Kootenai Lake, 46°33′28″N 114°19′34″W, el. 6,306 feet (1,922 m)
- North Totem Lake, 46°22′50″N 114°24′07″W, el. 7,316 feet (2,230 m)
- Park Lake, 45°53′21″N 113°33′31″W, el. 7,756 feet (2,364 m)
- Pass Lake, 45°43′17″N 114°04′53″W, el. 6,690 feet (2,040 m)
- Pearl Lake, 46°27′27″N 114°22′33″W, el. 7,103 feet (2,165 m)
- Peterson Lake, 46°38′05″N 114°14′00″W, el. 6,503 feet (1,982 m)
- Piquett Lake, 45°44′17″N 114°11′22″W, el. 8,005 feet (2,440 m)
- Ripple Lake, 45°55′54″N 113°33′31″W, el. 7,831 feet (2,387 m)
- Saint Mary Lake, 46°30′20″N 114°16′48″W, el. 7,785 feet (2,373 m)
- Shadow Lake, 46°01′54″N 113°45′08″W, el. 7,703 feet (2,348 m)
- Shannon Lake, 46°03′17″N 114°13′42″W, el. 4,560 feet (1,390 m)
- Shelf Lake, 45°44′26″N 114°10′58″W, el. 7,690 feet (2,340 m)
- Slate Lake, 45°44′03″N 114°11′03″W, el. 8,041 feet (2,451 m)
- South Bear Lake, 46°22′16″N 114°24′34″W, el. 7,359 feet (2,243 m)
- South Fork Lake, 46°26′59″N 114°22′12″W, el. 6,785 feet (2,068 m)
- South Fork Lakes, 46°35′00″N 114°19′42″W, el. 7,192 feet (2,192 m)
- South Kootenai Lake, 46°32′20″N 114°19′13″W, el. 6,260 feet (1,910 m)
- Sweeney Lake, 46°36′43″N 114°16′22″W, el. 7,342 feet (2,238 m)
- Tag Alder Lake, 46°17′39″N 114°16′05″W, el. 7,214 feet (2,199 m)
- Tamarack Lake, 45°56′33″N 114°19′31″W, el. 7,428 feet (2,264 m)
- Tenmile Lake, 46°10′28″N 114°26′12″W, el. 6,942 feet (2,116 m)
- Totem Peak Lake, 46°22′37″N 114°23′14″W, el. 7,782 feet (2,372 m)
- Trapper Lake, 45°54′34″N 114°21′31″W, el. 7,254 feet (2,211 m)
- Trout Lake, 46°03′25″N 113°48′27″W, el. 7,703 feet (2,348 m)
- Twelvemile Lake, 46°09′48″N 114°27′22″W, el. 6,663 feet (2,031 m)
- Twin Lakes, 46°09′26″N 114°29′48″W, el. 6,545 feet (1,995 m)
- Two Lakes, 46°24′23″N 114°23′15″W, el. 7,218 feet (2,200 m)
- Watchtower Lake, 45°50′44″N 114°29′13″W, el. 7,543 feet (2,299 m)
- White Lake, 46°05′11″N 114°24′05″W, el. 6,959 feet (2,121 m)

== Reservoirs ==
- Bass Lake, 46°35′35″N 114°16′57″W, el. 6,801 feet (2,073 m)
- Big Creek Lake, 46°29′42″N 114°21′15″W, el. 5,869 feet (1,789 m)
- Blodgett Lake, 46°15′08″N 114°27′18″W, el. 6,788 feet (2,069 m)
- Burnt Fork Lake, 46°18′12″N 113°50′09″W, el. 7,316 feet (2,230 m)
- Canyon Lake, 46°14′42″N 114°19′45″W, el. 7,303 feet (2,226 m)
- Dam Creek Lake, 46°15′56″N 113°48′01″W, el. 7,303 feet (2,226 m)
- Duffy Lake, 46°38′33″N 114°15′27″W, el. 7,333 feet (2,235 m)
- Fish Lake, 46°05′54″N 114°27′15″W, el. 6,693 feet (2,040 m)
- Fred Burr Lake, 46°19′46″N 114°25′02″W, el. 7,467 feet (2,276 m)
- Fred Burr Reservoir, 46°21′27″N 114°19′02″W, el. 5,141 feet (1,567 m)
- Gleason Lake, 46°17′57″N 113°53′49″W, el. 6,624 feet (2,019 m)
- Hauf Lake, 46°17′42″N 114°19′27″W, el. 7,523 feet (2,293 m)
- High Lake, 46°15′24″N 114°21′45″W, el. 7,382 feet (2,250 m)
- Holloway Lake, 46°38′11″N 114°15′44″W, el. 7,798 feet (2,377 m)
- Lake Como, 46°03′55″N 114°14′09″W, el. 4,245 feet (1,294 m)
- Lower Twin Lake, 46°09′12″N 114°29′45″W, el. 6,545 feet (1,995 m)
- Mill Lake, 46°17′51″N 114°25′14″W, el. 6,545 feet (1,995 m)
- Painted Rocks Lake, 45°43′06″N 114°16′51″W, el. 4,626 feet (1,410 m)
- Schoolmarm Lake, 45°54′47″N 113°56′47″W, el. 4,685 feet (1,428 m)
- Sears Lake, 46°17′58″N 114°22′16″W, el. 6,706 feet (2,044 m)
- Stevensville Reservoir, 46°30′03″N 114°02′44″W, el. 3,556 feet (1,084 m)
- Tamarack Lake, 45°56′30″N 114°19′21″W, el. 7,487 feet (2,282 m)
- Tin Cup Lake, 45°56′54″N 114°23′33″W, el. 6,283 feet (1,915 m)
- Tin Cup Lake, 45°56′36″N 114°23′57″W, el. 6,299 feet (1,920 m)
- Upper Twin Lake, 46°09′42″N 114°29′57″W, el. 6,545 feet (1,995 m)
- Wyant Lake, 46°14′38″N 114°20′27″W, el. 7,661 feet (2,335 m)

== See also ==
- List of lakes in Montana
