= Mud Lake (Montana) =

There are over a dozen lakes named Mud Lake within the U.S. state of Montana.

- Mud Lake, Beaverhead County, Montana. 44°36′32″N 112°10′52″W
- Mud Lake, Beaverhead County, Montana. 45°11′10″N 113°26′35″W
- Mud Lake, Beaverhead County, Montana. 45°39′12″N 113°23′44″W
- Mud Lake, Blaine County, Montana. 48°35′20″N 108°36′51″W
- Mud Lake, Flathead County, Montana. 47°38′20″N 113°20′03″W
- Mud Lake, Flathead County, Montana. 48°06′42″N 113°59′42″W
- Mud Lake, Flathead County, Montana. 48°27′40″N 114°02′25″W
- Mud Lake, Flathead County, Montana. 48°37′39″N 114°12′46″W
- Winona Lake, also known as Mud Lake, Flathead County, Montana. 48°43′46″N 114°14′10″W
- Mud Lake, Granite County, Montana. 46°13′57″N 113°45′26″W
- Mud Lake, Granite County, Montana. 46°19′30″N 113°06′48″W
- Martin Lake, also known as Mud Lake, Hill County, Montana. 48°44′11″N 109°30′39″W
- Mud Lake, Hill County, Montana. 48°50′52″N 109°41′23″W
- Mud Lake, Lake County, Montana. 47°37′02″N 113°59′45″W
- Mud Lake, Lincoln County, Montana. 48°25′28″N 115°51′11″W
- Deep Lake, also known as Mud Lake, Lincoln County, Montana. 48°43′51″N 114°57′11″W
- Mud Lake, Lincoln County, Montana. 48°51′23″N 115°10′28″W
- Mud Lake, Madison County, Montana. 45°33′40″N 112°07′46″W
- Mud Lake, Mineral County, Montana. 46°47′52″N 114°50′38″W
- Mud Lake, Park County, Montana. 45°03′59″N 109°54′22″W
- Mud Lake, Park County, Montana. 45°25′16″N 110°51′52″W
- Mud Lake, Park County, Montana. 45°40′48″N 110°33′03″W
- Mud Lake, Phillips County, Montana. 48°26′44″N 107°38′15″W
- Mud Lake, Powell County, Montana. 47°04′34″N 113°11′34″W
- Mud Lake, Ravalli County, Montana. 46°09′43″N 114°28′25″W
- Mud Lake, Silver Bow County, Montana. 45°55′00″N 112°53′56″W
- Mud Lake, Toole County, Montana. 48°49′32″N 112°07′28″W
