= Fish Lake (Minnesota) =

Lake in the state of Minnesota, United States

- Location within Minnesota
- Location: Chisago County, Minnesota
- Coordinates: 45°34′50″N 93°2′4″W
- Type: lake

Fish Lake is a lake in Chisago County, Minnesota, in the United States.

"Fish Lake" is an English translation of the native Ojibwe language name.

== See also ==
- List of lakes in Minnesota
