= Fish Lake (Marion County, Oregon) =

- Murphy Lake
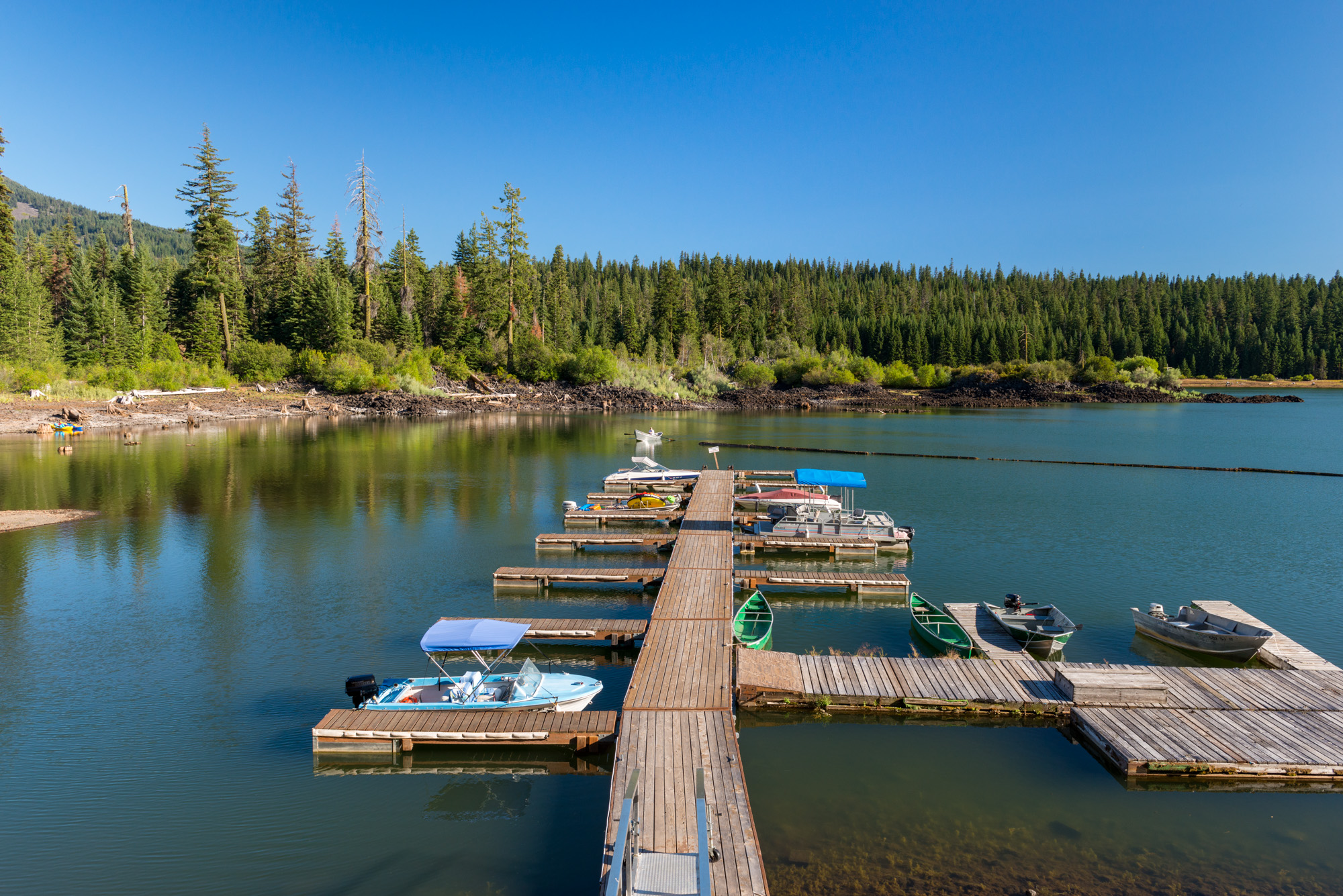
- The marina at the Fish Lake Resort in the Cascade Mountains.

- Location within Oregon Location within the United States
- Location: Marion County, Oregon
- Coordinates: 44°50′01″N 121°48′54″W
- Type: natural freshwater lake
- Basin countries: United States
- Max. length: 1,750 feet (530 m)
- Max. width: 1,070 feet (330 m)
- Surface area: 20 acres (8.1 ha)
- Surface elevation: 4,265 ft (1,300 m)

Fish Lake (also, Murphy Lake) is a teardrop-shaped lake in Marion County, Oregon, United States. Fish Lake lies at an elevation of 4265 feet (1300 m). It is in the northern section of the Olallie Scenic Area. Squirrel Creek flows out of the northern part of this lake.
