= List of lakes of Pondera County, Montana =

There are at least 29 named lakes and reservoirs in Pondera County, Montana.

== Lakes ==
- Abbott Lake, 48°24′24″N 112°13′36″W, el. 3,619 feet (1,103 m)
- Alkali Lake, 48°24′32″N 112°27′40″W, el. 3,786 feet (1,154 m)
- Blue Lake, 48°09′05″N 113°05′33″W, el. 5,863 feet (1,787 m)
- Cody Lake, 48°10′23″N 112°49′09″W, el. 4,695 feet (1,431 m)
- Deep Lake, 48°10′30″N 112°47′23″W, el. 4,678 feet (1,426 m)
- Emerald Lake, 48°09′30″N 113°01′18″W, el. 6,585 feet (2,007 m)
- Eyraud Lakes, 48°01′03″N 111°58′55″W, el. 3,720 feet (1,130 m)
- Fish Lake, 48°09′13″N 112°48′50″W, el. 4,934 feet (1,504 m)
- Green Lake, 48°14′36″N 112°52′01″W, el. 4,826 feet (1,471 m)
- Heron Lake, 48°22′48″N 112°01′14″W, el. 3,451 feet (1,052 m)
- Hidden Lake, 48°10′03″N 112°50′46″W, el. 4,678 feet (1,426 m)
- Horn Lake, 48°17′13″N 112°54′19″W, el. 4,751 feet (1,448 m)
- Howes Lakes, 48°10′17″N 112°48′11″W, el. 4,734 feet (1,443 m)
- Kiyo Crag Lake, 48°18′19″N 113°07′14″W, el. 6,211 feet (1,893 m)
- Letz Lake, 48°13′55″N 111°49′33″W, el. 3,366 feet (1,026 m)
- Mitten Lake, 48°18′13″N 112°58′52″W, el. 4,747 feet (1,447 m)
- Round Lake, 48°09′42″N 112°47′08″W, el. 4,757 feet (1,450 m)
- Slippery Hoof Lake, 48°16′11″N 113°02′31″W, el. 4,842 feet (1,476 m)
- Stetler Lakes, 48°25′45″N 112°12′37″W, el. 3,602 feet (1,098 m)
- Twin Lakes, 48°09′11″N 112°47′31″W, el. 4,800 feet (1,500 m)
- Waddel Lakes, 48°11′09″N 112°47′52″W, el. 4,682 feet (1,427 m)

== Reservoirs ==
- Conrad Reservoir, 48°11′25″N 112°01′20″W, el. 3,714 feet (1,132 m)
- Fowler Reservoir, 48°13′18″N 111°26′03″W, el. 3,314 feet (1,010 m)
- Fowler Reservoir, 48°12′45″N 111°36′19″W, el. 3,353 feet (1,022 m)
- Green Lake, 48°14′36″N 112°51′39″W, el. 4,823 feet (1,470 m)
- Lake Frances, 48°15′46″N 112°12′28″W, el. 3,819 feet (1,164 m)
- Swift Reservoir, 48°09′49″N 112°52′20″W, el. 4,862 feet (1,482 m)
- Tedson Reservoir, 48°09′05″N 112°44′27″W, el. 4,678 feet (1,426 m)

== See also ==
- List of lakes in Montana
