= Lists of lakes =

This is a list of lists of lakes.

- Antarctic lakes
- Lakes of Titan
- List of alpine lakes
- List of Antarctic subglacial lakes
- List of dams and reservoirs
- List of drying lakes
- List of international lakes
- List of lakes by area
- List of lakes by depth
- List of lakes by volume
- List of largest lakes and seas in the Solar System
- List of largest lakes of Europe
- List of prehistoric lakes
- Recursive islands and lakes
- Rift Valley lakes

== Lists of lakes that share the same name ==
- List of lakes named Diamond
- List of lakes named Fish Lake
- List of lakes named Lone Star Lake
- List of lakes named McArthur
- List of lakes named Summit Lake in British Columbia

== Lists by country ==
- List of lakes of Afghanistan
- List of lakes of Albania
- List of lakes of Algeria
- List of lakes of Andorra
- List of lakes of Angola
- List of lakes of Antigua and Barbuda
- List of lakes of Argentina
- List of lakes of Armenia
- List of lakes of Australia
  - Lakes and other water bodies of Victoria (Australia)
  - Lakes and reservoirs of Melbourne
  - List of lakes of Western Australia, A–C
  - List of lakes of Western Australia, D–K
  - List of lakes of Western Australia, L–P
  - List of lakes of Western Australia, Q–Z
- List of lakes of Austria
- List of lakes of Azerbaijan
- List of lakes of the Bahamas
- List of lakes of Bahrain
- List of lakes of Bangladesh
- List of lakes of Barbados
- List of lakes of Belarus
- List of lakes of Bavaria
- List of lakes of Belgium
- List of lakes of Belize
- List of lakes of Benin
- List of lakes of Bhutan
- List of lakes of Bolivia
- List of lakes of Bosnia and Herzegovina
- List of lakes of Botswana
- List of lakes of Brazil
- List of lakes of Brunei
- List of lakes of Bulgaria
- List of lakes of Burkina Faso
- List of lakes of Burundi
- List of lakes of Cambodia
- List of lakes of Cameroon
- List of lakes of Canada
  - List of lakes of Alberta
  - List of lakes of British Columbia
    - List of lakes of Yoho National Park
  - List of lakes of Manitoba
  - List of lakes of New Brunswick
  - List of lakes of Newfoundland and Labrador
  - List of lakes of the Northwest Territories
  - List of lakes of Nova Scotia
  - List of lakes of Nunavut
  - List of lakes of Ontario
  - List of lakes of Quebec
    - List of lakes in Val-des-Monts, Quebec
  - List of lakes of Saskatchewan
  - List of lakes of Yukon
- List of lakes of Cape Verde
- List of lakes of Chad
- List of lakes of Chile
- List of lakes of China
- List of lakes of Colombia
- List of lakes of Comoros
- List of lakes of the Republic of the Congo
- List of lakes of Democratic Republic of the Congo
- List of lakes of the Cook Islands
- List of lakes of Costa Rica
- List of lakes of Croatia
- List of lakes of Cuba
- List of lakes of Cyprus
- List of lakes of the Czech Republic
- List of lakes of Denmark
- List of lakes of Djibouti
- List of lakes of Dominica
- List of lakes of the Dominican Republic
- List of lakes of East Timor
- List of lakes of Ecuador
- List of lakes of Egypt
- List of lakes of El Salvador
- List of lakes of Equatorial Guinea
- List of lakes of Eritrea
- List of lakes of Estonia
- List of lakes of Ethiopia
- List of lakes of the Faroe Islands
- List of lakes of Fiji
- List of lakes of Finland
- List of lakes of France
- List of lakes of Gabon
- List of lakes of Gambia
- List of lakes of Georgia (country)
- List of lakes of Germany
- List of lakes of Ghana
- List of lakes of Greece
- List of lakes of Grenada
- List of lakes of Guatemala
- List of lakes of Guinea
- List of lakes of Guyana
- List of lakes of Haiti
- List of lakes of Honduras
- List of lakes of Hungary
- List of lakes of Himachal Pradesh
- List of lakes of Hong Kong
- List of lakes of Iceland
- List of lakes of India
- List of lakes of Indonesia
- List of loughs of Ireland
- List of lakes of Israel
- List of lakes of Italy
- List of lakes of Ivory Coast
- List of lakes of Jamaica
- List of lakes of Japan
- List of lakes of Jordan
- List of lakes of Kazakhstan
- List of lakes of Kenya
- List of lakes of Kiribati
- List of lakes of Korea
- List of lakes of Kosovo
- List of lakes of Kuwait
- List of lakes of Kyrgyzstan
- List of lakes of Laos
- List of lakes of Latvia
- List of lakes of Lebanon
- List of lakes of Lesotho
- List of lakes of Liberia
- List of lakes of Libya
- List of lakes of Liechtenstein
- List of lakes of Lithuania
- List of lakes of Luxembourg
- List of lakes of Malaysia
- List of lakes of Mexico
- List of lakes of Mongolia
- List of lakes of Montenegro
- List of lakes of the Netherlands
- List of lakes of New Zealand
- List of lakes of Norway
  - List of lakes of Aust-Agder
- List of lakes of Pakistan
- List of lakes of Papua New Guinea
- List of lakes of Poland
- List of lakes of Romania
  - List of lakes of Bucharest
- List of lakes of Russia
- List of lakes of Rwanda
- List of lakes of Serbia
- List of lakes of Singapore
- List of lakes of Slovenia
- List of lakes of South Africa
- List of lakes of Sweden
- List of lakes of Switzerland
  - List of dams and reservoirs in Switzerland
  - List of mountain lakes of Switzerland
- List of lakes of Taiwan
- List of lakes of Tamil Nadu
- List of lakes of Tanzania
- List of lakes of Turkey
- List of lakes of Turkmenistan
- List of lakes of Uganda
- List of lakes of Uzbekistan
- List of lakes of Vietnam
- List of lakes of Zambia
- List of lakes and lochs of the United Kingdom
  - List of lakes of the Lake District
  - List of lakes of England
  - List of lochs of Scotland
  - List of lakes of Wales
  - List of loughs of Ireland
- List of lakes of the United States
  - List of lakes of the United States by area
  - List of lakes of the St. Johns River
  - List of lakes of Alabama
  - List of lakes of Alaska
  - List of lakes of Arizona
  - List of lakes of Arkansas
  - List of lakes of California
    - List of lakes of the San Francisco Bay Area
    - List of lakes of Lake County, California
  - List of lakes of Colorado
  - List of lakes of Connecticut
  - List of lakes of Delaware
  - List of lakes of Florida
  - List of lakes of Georgia (U.S. state)
  - List of lakes of Hawaii
  - List of lakes of Idaho
  - List of lakes of Illinois
  - List of lakes of Indiana
  - List of lakes of Iowa
  - List of lakes, reservoirs, and dams in Kansas
  - List of lakes of Kentucky
  - List of lakes of Louisiana
  - List of lakes of Maine
  - List of lakes of Maryland
  - List of lakes of Massachusetts
  - List of lakes of Michigan
  - List of lakes of Minnesota
  - List of lakes of Mississippi
  - List of lakes of Missouri
  - List of lakes of Montana
  - List of lakes of Nebraska
  - List of lakes of Nevada
  - List of lakes of New Hampshire
  - List of lakes of New Jersey
  - List of lakes of New Mexico
  - List of lakes of New York
  - List of lakes of North Carolina
  - List of lakes of North Dakota
  - List of lakes of Ohio
  - List of lakes of Oklahoma
  - List of lakes of Oregon
  - List of lakes of Pennsylvania
  - List of lakes of Puerto Rico
  - List of lakes of Rhode Island
  - List of lakes of South Carolina
  - List of lakes of South Dakota
  - List of lakes of Tennessee
  - List of lakes of Texas
  - List of lakes of Utah
  - List of lakes of Vermont
  - List of lakes of Virginia
  - List of lakes of Washington
  - List of lakes of West Virginia
  - List of lakes of Wisconsin
  - List of lakes of Wyoming
