= List of lakes of Uzbekistan =

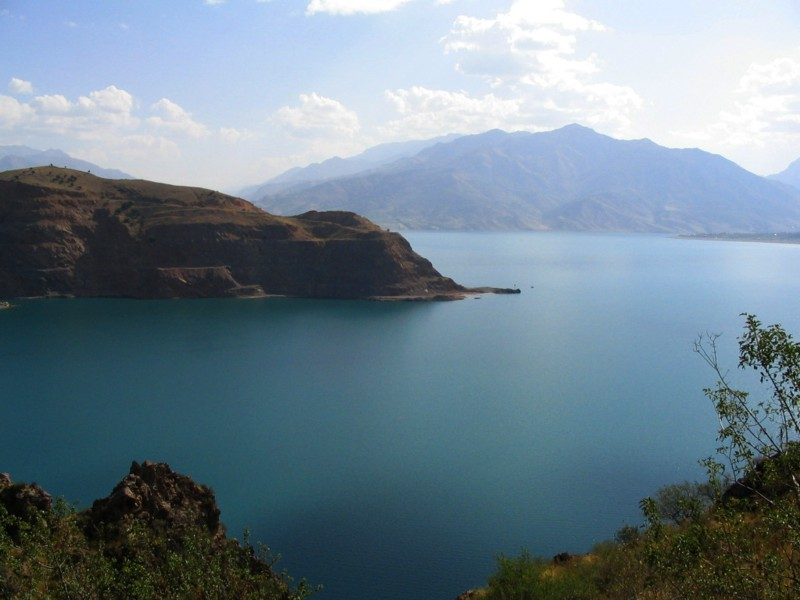
Charvak, an artificial lake in Tashkent Province

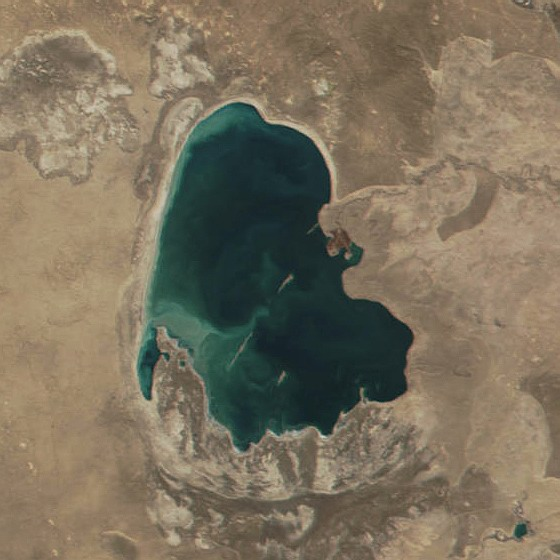
Aerial photograph of Sarygamysh Lake on the border with Turkmenistan, December 2001

This is a list of lakes in Uzbekistan:

- Akchakol Lake
- Aral Sea
- Arnasay Lakes
- Ayazkala Lake
- Aydar Lake
- Botakol
- Lake Charvak
- Karateren Lake
- Sarygamysh Lake
- Toʻdakoʻl suv ombori
- Tuyabuguz Reservoir
- Tuzkon
- Zhyltyrbas Lake
- Tuzkan Lake
