= Shounter Lake =

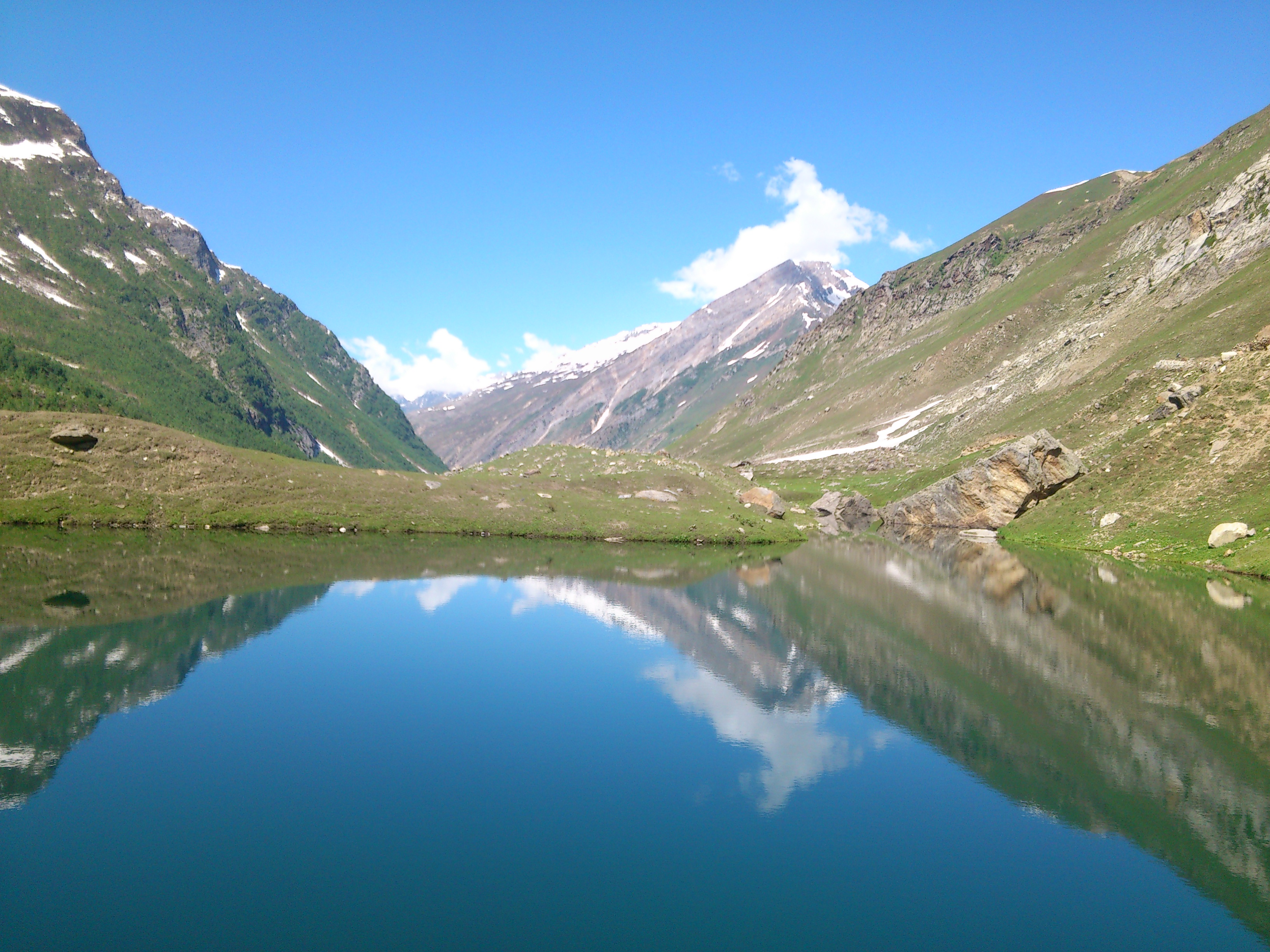
- Shounter Lake, Azad Kashmir

- Location within Azad Kashmir
- Location: Shounter, Neelum Valley, Azad Kashmir
- Coordinates: 34°58′23″N 74°30′46″E
- Type: Alpine Glacial lake
- Primary inflows: Glacial waters
- Basin countries: Pakistan
- Residence time: May - August
- Surface elevation: 3,100 meters (10,200 ft)

Shounter Lake is a scenic lake located in Shounter Valley, a sub valley of Neelam Valley, Azad Kashmir, Pakistan, at the elevation of 3,100 meters (10,200 ft). The lake is fed by glacial melt. It is encircled by snow-covered mountains, lush vegetation and specimens of Iris hookeriana dispersed around the lake. The lake is accessible from Kel town of Neelum Valley, by a jeepable track.

== See also ==
- Ratti Gali Lake
- Saral Lake
- Mahodand Lake
- Lulusar Lake
- Chitta Katha Lake
- List of lakes in Pakistan
