= List of alpine lakes =

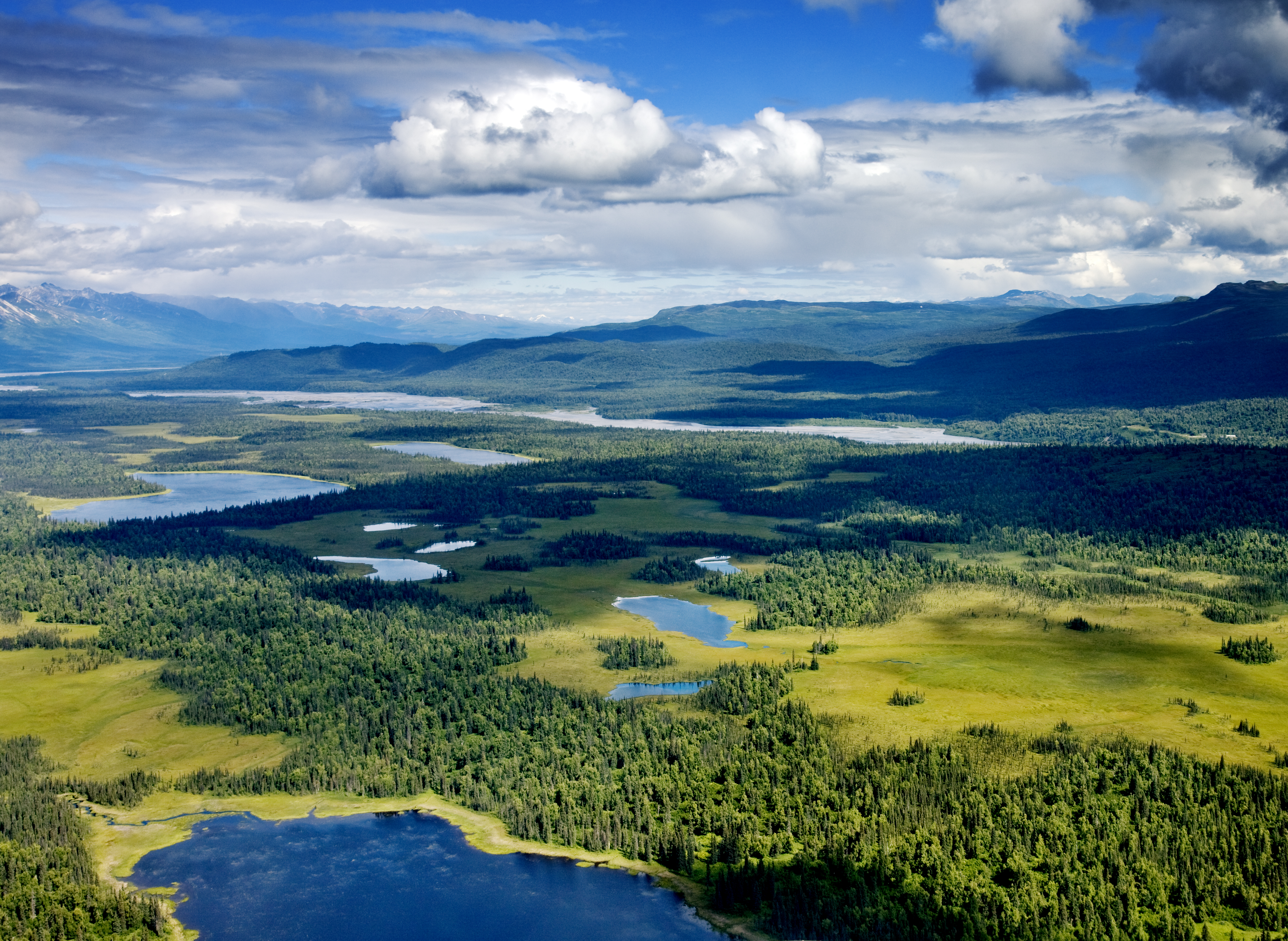
Alpine lakes and forest, Denali National Park, Alaska

This is a list of alpine lakes.

- Ansoo Lake, Pakistan
- Changu Lake, India
- Chitta Katha Lake, Pakistan

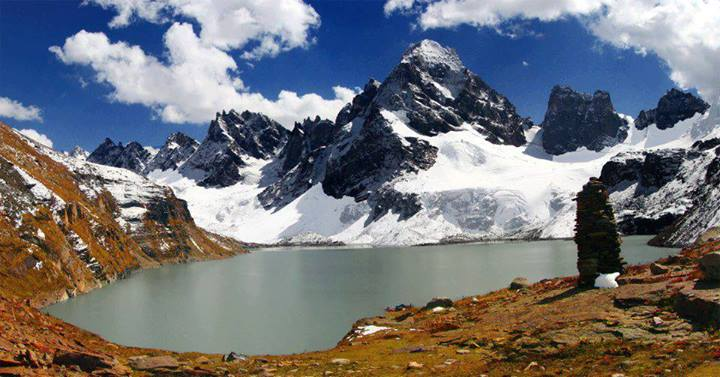
Chitta Katha Lake in Pakistan

- Crater Lake, Oregon, USA
- Chandra Taal, India
- Dudipatsar Lake, Pakistan

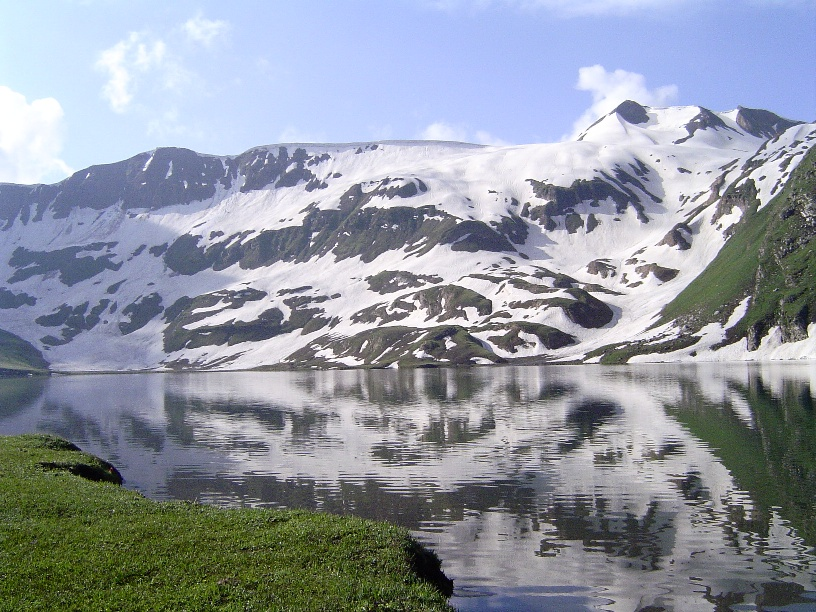
Dudipatsar Lake in Pakistan

- Gangabal Lake, India
- Garibaldi Lake, British Columbia, Canada
- Gurudongmar Lake, India
- Handarap Lake, Pakistan
- Heaven Lake, North Korea/China
- Issyk Kul, Kyrgyzstan
- Lulusar Lake, Pakistan
- Karambar Lake, Pakistan
- Katora Lake, Pakistan
- Lake Sevan, Armenia
- Lake Baikal, Russia
- Lake Louise, Alberta, Canada
- Lake Saiful Muluk, Pakistan

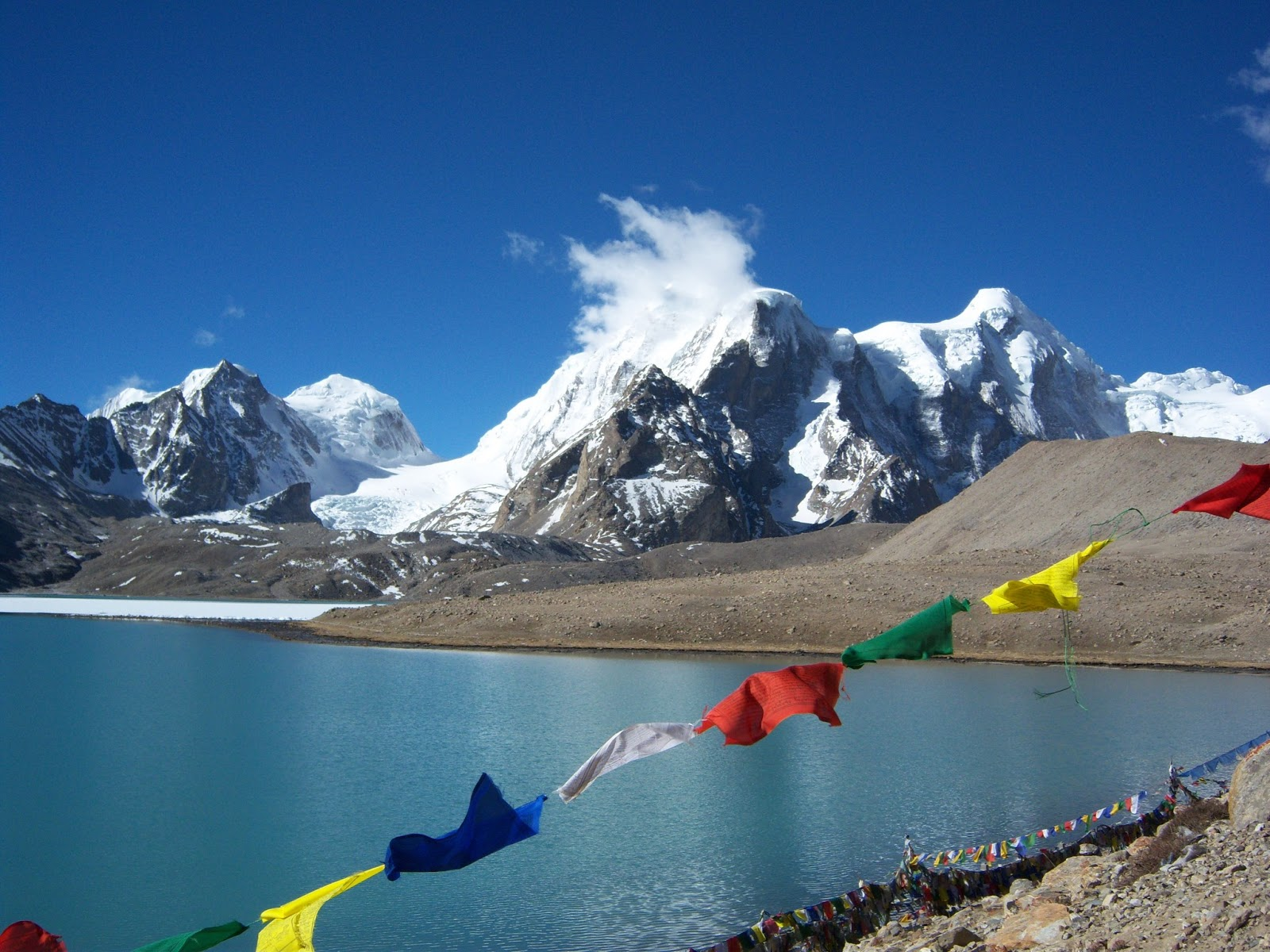
Gurudongmar Lake in India

- Lake Tahoe, California/Nevada USA
- Lake Titicaca, Peru/Bolivia
- Lake Van, Turkey
- Moraine Lake, Alberta, Canada
- Naltar Lake, Pakistan

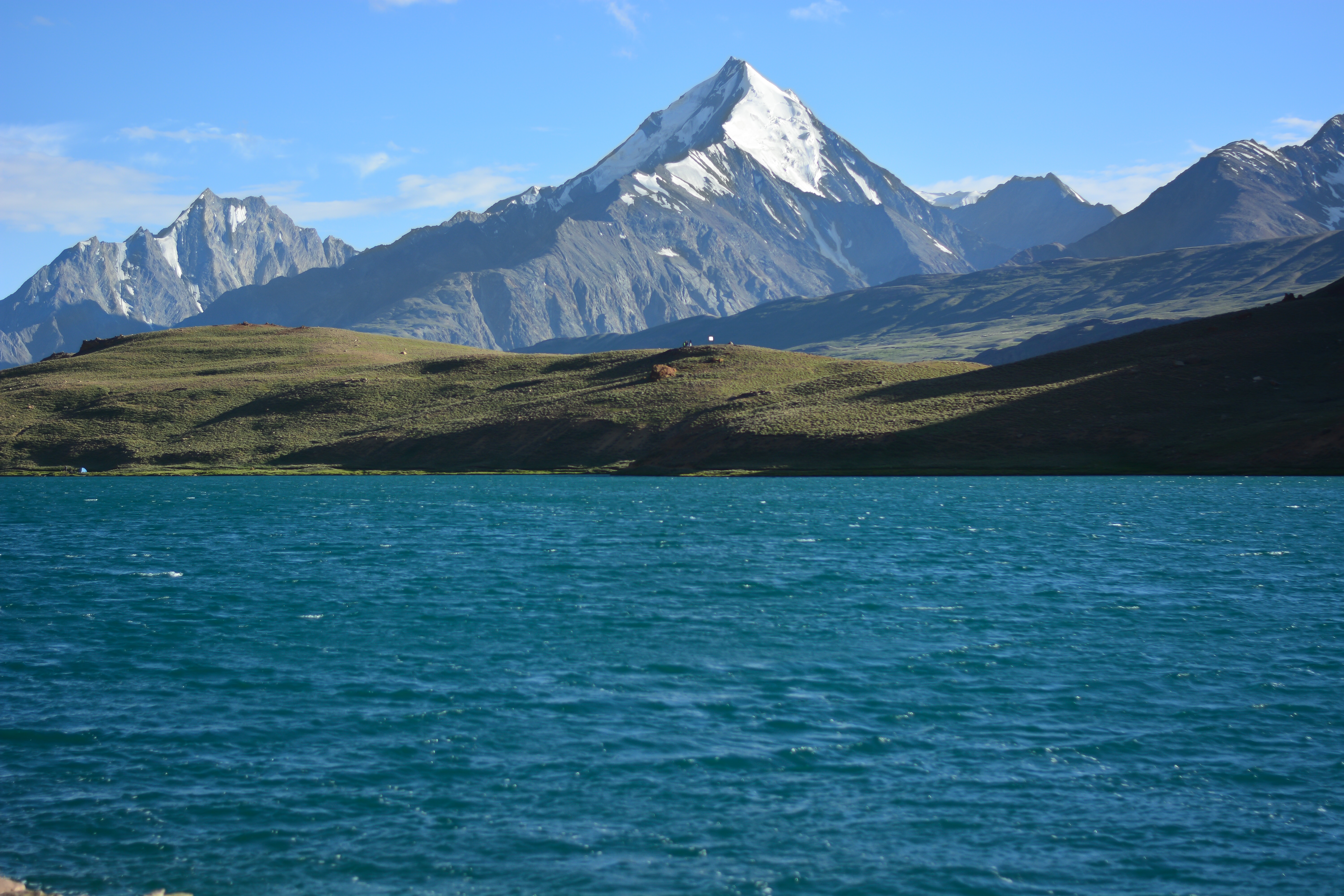
Chandra Taal Lake in India

- Paristan Lake, Pakistan
- Pangong Tso, India
- Phoksundo Lake, Nepal
- Peyto Lake, Alberta, Canada
- Rara Lake, Nepal
- Rush Lake, Pakistan
- Ratti Gali Lake, Pakistan
- Tarsar Lake, India
- Saral Lake, Pakistan

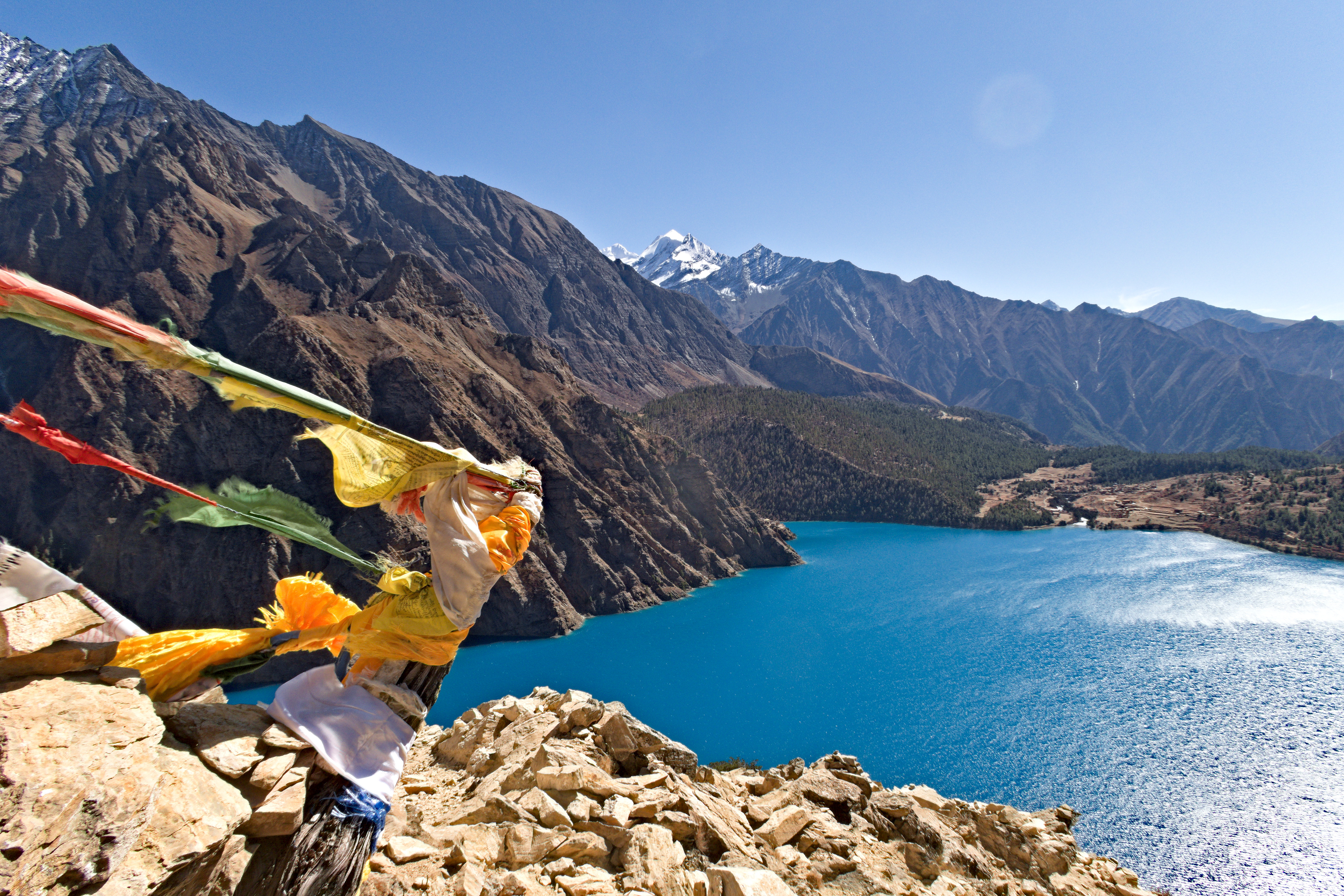
Phoksundo Lake in Nepal

- Sheosar Lake, Pakistan
- Tenaya Lake, California
- Urmia Lake, Iran
- Yellowstone Lake, Wyoming, USA
