= Nurafshon =

Nurafshon Nurafshon / Нурафшон
- City
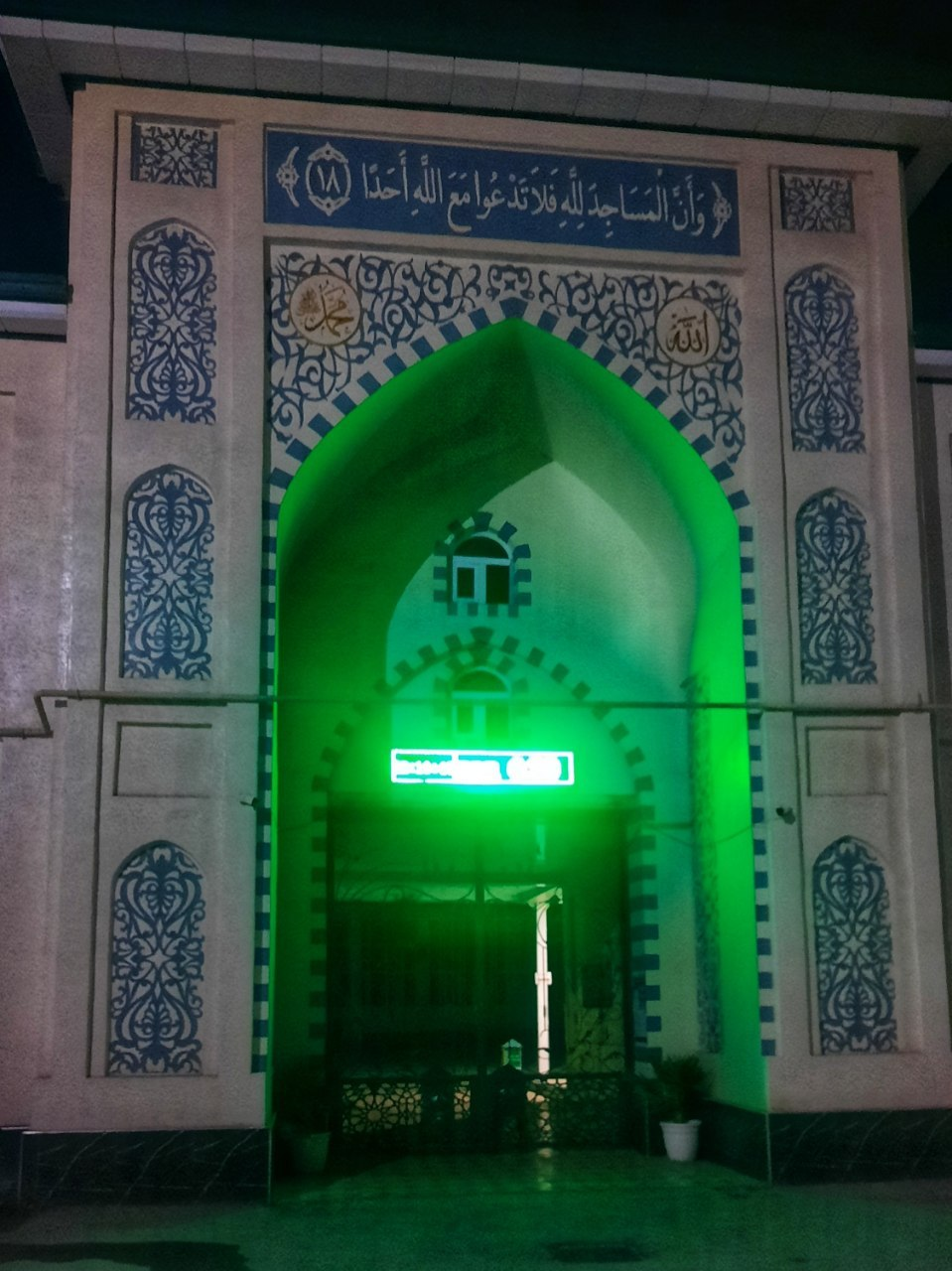
- Nurafshon masjid

- Location in Uzbekistan
- Coordinates: 41°02′N 69°21′E
- Country: Uzbekistan
- Region: Tashkent Region

Area
  - Total: 30 km^{2} (12 sq mi)

Population (2025)
  - Total: 57,523
  - Density: 1,900/km^{2} (5,000/sq mi)
- Time zone: UTC+5

Nurafshon (Uzbek: Nurafshon / Нурафшон) is a district-level city and the administrative centre of Tashkent Region in Uzbekistan. It is also the seat of the Oʻrtachirchiq District, but not part of it. It has an area of 30 km^{2} (12 sq mi) and the population of the city is 51,400 (2021).

Until 2017, the town was known as Toytepa. The towns Yangihayot and Chigirik are part of the city.

== History ==
Two Zoroastrian period ossuaries, dating to the 6th century, are kept in the Samarkand museum. It received the status of a city in 1973. Until 2017, it was called Toytepa (Uzbek. Toʻytepa/Tўytepa) and was a city of rayon subordination of Oʻrtachirchiq District.

On August 25, 2017, the Senate of the Oliy Majlis of the Republic of Uzbekistan at its plenary session decided to rename the city of Toytepa to Nurafshon.

== Geography ==
The city of Nurafshon is located 4 km from the train station Toytepa, on the highway Tashkent - Kokand, 25 km south of Tashkent.

== Population ==
The population of Nurafshon as of July 1, 2018 is 49,731. It is estimated that the town's population was previously over 29,000 and in 1975 it was 17,000.

== Economy ==
Important cotton processing enterprises exist in Nurafshon, mostly due to Uzbek-South Korean joint ventures. Fluorspar, the most important source of fluorine, is mined at Nurafshon. The city has an aluminum ore processing plant, a garment factory, trucking companies, and manufacturing industries.

== Education ==
In the city there is general secondary school No.1 (formerly named after A. S. Pushkin), which is one of the oldest schools in the city.

The school has Russian and Uzbek language classes, and special attention is paid to the study of foreign languages - English, German, French and Korean.

There is also a general secondary school No.48 (formerly named after A. P. Gaidar, located on Toshkent Yoli Street), which also has Russian and Uzbek classes.

There is a 28th general education Kazakh-language school named after Abai Qunanbaiuly.

== Attractions ==
On the western outskirts of the city (on the road Nurafshon - Tuyaboʻgʻiz) is located Ulkantoytepe settlement, which was severely destroyed as a result of the deployment of a military unit there during the Soviet era.

The hillfort was explored:

- in 1875 — by D. M. Gremenitsky;
- in 1884 — by N. Primkulov and N. I. Veselovsky;
- in 1890 — by K. H. T. Krause;
- in 1896 — by members of the Turkestan Group of Amateurs of Archeology;
- in 1923 — by M. E. Masson;
- in 1929 — by A. A. Potapov;
- in 1958 — by Y. F. Buryakov and S. X. Ishankhanov.

Small excavations and archaeological research were carried out here. Only a rectangular shahriston with an area of 20 hectares and a citadel in the northern part has been preserved.

Both the citadel and the shahriston are surrounded by defensive walls (enceinte), the latter retaining traces of 4 gates. The thickness of the cultural layer in some places exceeds 10 meters.

The available material allows us to attribute the settlement of the area to the time of the first centuries AD, and the blossoming of life - to the IX-X centuries and especially - to the XI-XII centuries.

It is identified with the medieval city of Nuket. Described by eastern geographers in the X-XII centuries A.D. in the Kara-Khanid era, it was for a certain time the capital of the Ilaq domain, which had its own mint.

During archaeological research, two ossuaries dating back to the 6th century and belonging to the Era of the Zoroastrianism were discovered. They are currently in the State Museum of History of Uzbekistan in Tashkent.
