= Zamira Mutalova =

- Born: May 11, 1930; Oʻrtachirchiq District, Tashkent Region, Uzbekistan
- Citizenship: Soviet Union; Uzbekistan
- Awards: Hero of Socialist Labor

Zamira Mutalova (Uzbek: Zamira Mutalova; born May 11, 1930) was a Soviet agricultural leader, a brigade farm named after Ilyich, O'rta Chirchik district, Tashkent Region, Hero of Socialist Labor (1947).

== Biography ==
Zamira Mutalova was born on May 11, 1930, in O'rta-Chirchik district of Tashkent region in an Uzbek family. She started working early. With the outbreak of World War II, she worked alongside adults in the cotton fields of the local collective farm named after Ilyich. At the age of fourteen, she was awarded the Order of the Red Banner of Labor. Zamira is a symbol of working children during the war. In 1946, her unit had a high yield. 101 quintals of cotton seeds were obtained from each hectare of 5 hectares of land. In 1953, she completed training courses for agricultural leaders of the Tashkent region, from 1953 to 1956 she worked as an instructor of the Department of Agriculture of the Communist party of Uzbekistan, from 1954 to 1955 as the Minister of Agriculture of the Uzbek SSR. In 1958, after graduating from the High Party School under the Central Committee of the CPSU, she was appointed the chairman of the executive committee of the Karasuv District Council of People's Deputies of the Tashkent region. From 1960 to 1961, she worked as a state farm director in Kalinin district of Tashkent region. From 1961 to 1963, she served as the deputy chairman of the Kalinin district executive committee of the Council of Workers' Deputies. At the age of 17, she was awarded the title of Hero of Socialist Labor. By the decree of the Presidium of the Supreme Council of the USSR on March 19, 1947, Zamira Mutalova was awarded the title of Hero of Socialist Labor with the Order of Lenin and the medal "Hammer and sickle" for her high performance in agriculture and record cotton harvest. She continued to work on the farm. Later, she was appointed the forewoman of the collective farm under the leadership of Mutal Qayumov.

== Awards ==
- Hero of Socialist Labor (March 19, 1947)
- Order of Lenin (March 19, 1947; April 27, 1948)
- Order of the Red Banner of Labour (December 25, 1944)
- Order of the Badge of Honour (January 23, 1947)
- Medal "For Distinguished Labour" (February 6, 1947)

== See also ==
- Hero of Socialist Labour
