= Sarmishsay =

Archaeological site in Uzbekistan

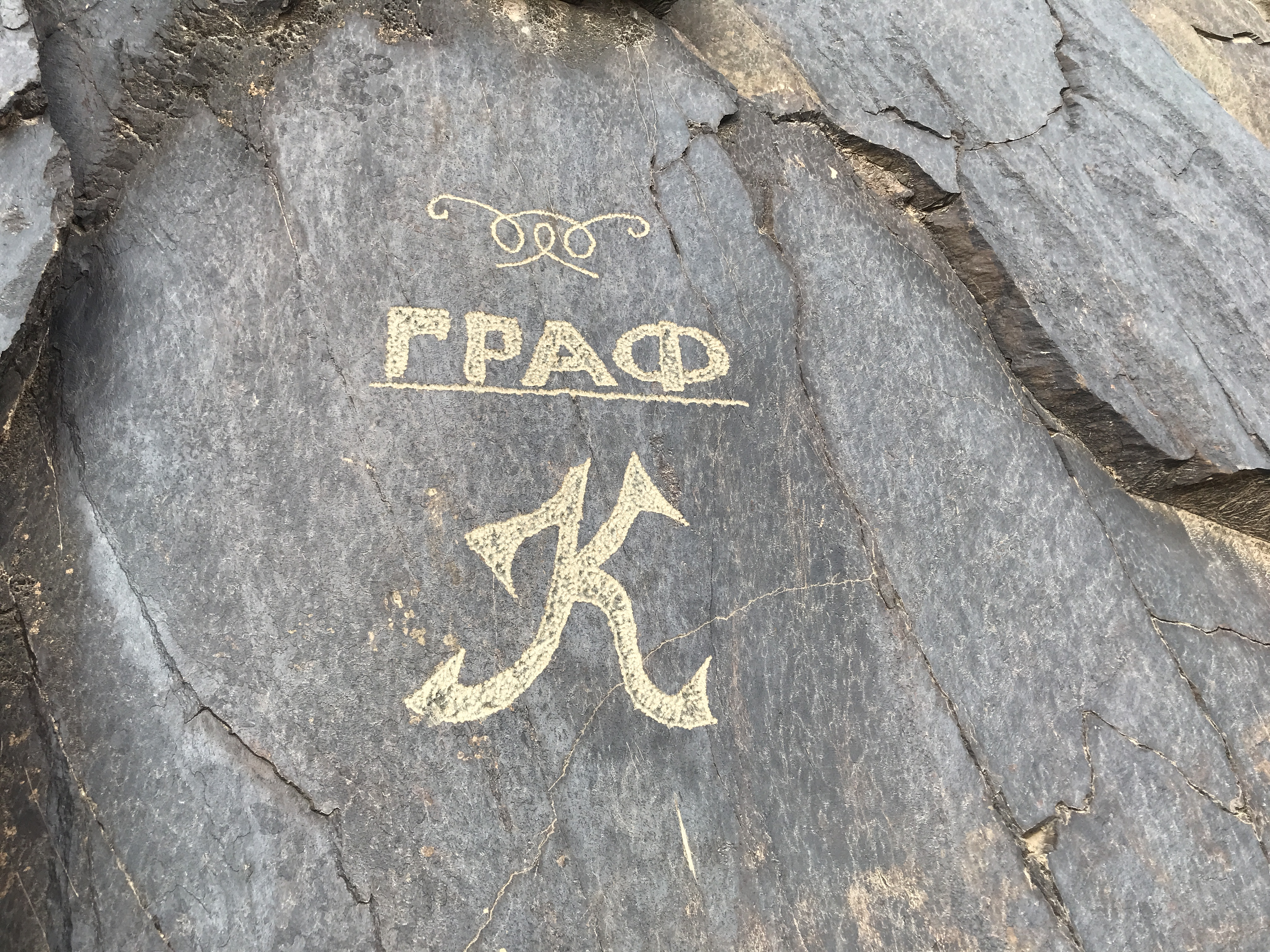
Pictures of Sarmishsay: Navoi region, Navbahor district, Sarmishsay gorge, "Uch tut" MFY

Sarmishsay (Uzbek: Sarmishsoy; also known as Sarmish Gorge) is located in the Karatau Mountain Range in the Nurata District of Navoiy Region of Uzbekistan. The gorge contains archeological remains dating back as far as the Stone Age, including two petroglyph sites with a total of 10,000 ancient rock carvings. According to UNESCO, it is the largest and most important rock art monument in Uzbekistan.

== Geography and natural history ==
The Karatau Mountain Range is a southern spur of the Western Tian Shan, a UNESCO World Heritage Site. Close to the Zarafshan Valley and the Kyzylkum Desert, the Karatau area has been an intersection of seasonal migration routes for people and animals since ancient times.

Sarmish Gorge was cut through the sandstone rock by the Sarmish River, which today is a small mountain stream. The slopes of the gorge are covered with thickets of trees and shrubs, as well as poppies and other wild flowers in the springtime. About 650 species of plants can be identified in the region. Historically the area would have supported a huge diversity of wildlife and been a fertile hunting ground, as is testified to by the variety of wild and domesticated animals shown in the Sarmish petroglyphs. Three of the species found here still are in Uzbekistan's Red List of endangered creatures, namely the Central Asian cobra, black vulture, and Severtsev sheep.

== History ==
Scientists at the Archaeological Institute of Uzbekistan’s Academy of Science believe that Sarmishay was inhabited by humans as early as the Paleolithic era (the Old Stone Age).

The area was settled by hunters and fishermen from the Kelteminar culture in the Neolithic period. The availability of water and good hunting made Sarmishay a good place to settle, and archaeologists have also found evidence of religious rites being performed. The earliest petroglyphs date from this time, though the majority are from the Bronze Age. Scythian tribes moved into Sarmishsay in the Iron Age and occupied the area from the 9th to 2nd centuries BC. We know that horses were important in their culture as they depicted them in petroglyphs of hunting scenes. There are pre-Islamic burials and altars dating from this period, too.

Sarmishsay was still occupied by communities after the arrival of Islam in Central Asia in the 8th century AD. There are a number of inscriptions carved into the rocks in Arabic. Sufi missionaries also left some carvings.

== Petroglyphs ==
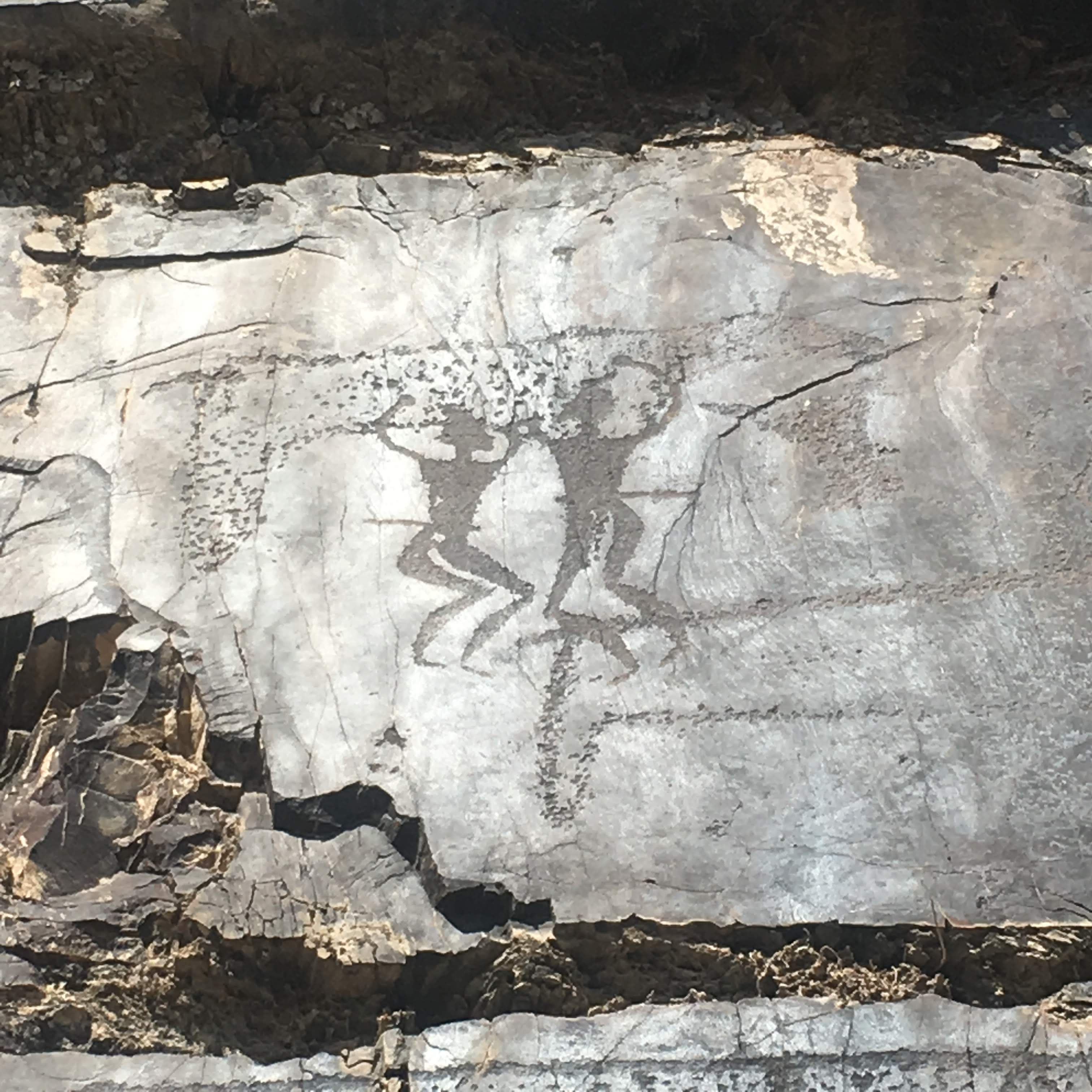
Petroglyph of a couple in Sarmishsay, Uzbekistan

To date, more than 10,000 petroglyphs have been discovered at Sarmishsay. They are recognised by UNESCO on the Tentative List for World Heritage Site status, and are within a protected natural park covering 5,000 hectares. The only comparable sites in Central Asia are Tamgaly in Kazakhstan and Saymali Tash in Kyrgyzstan.

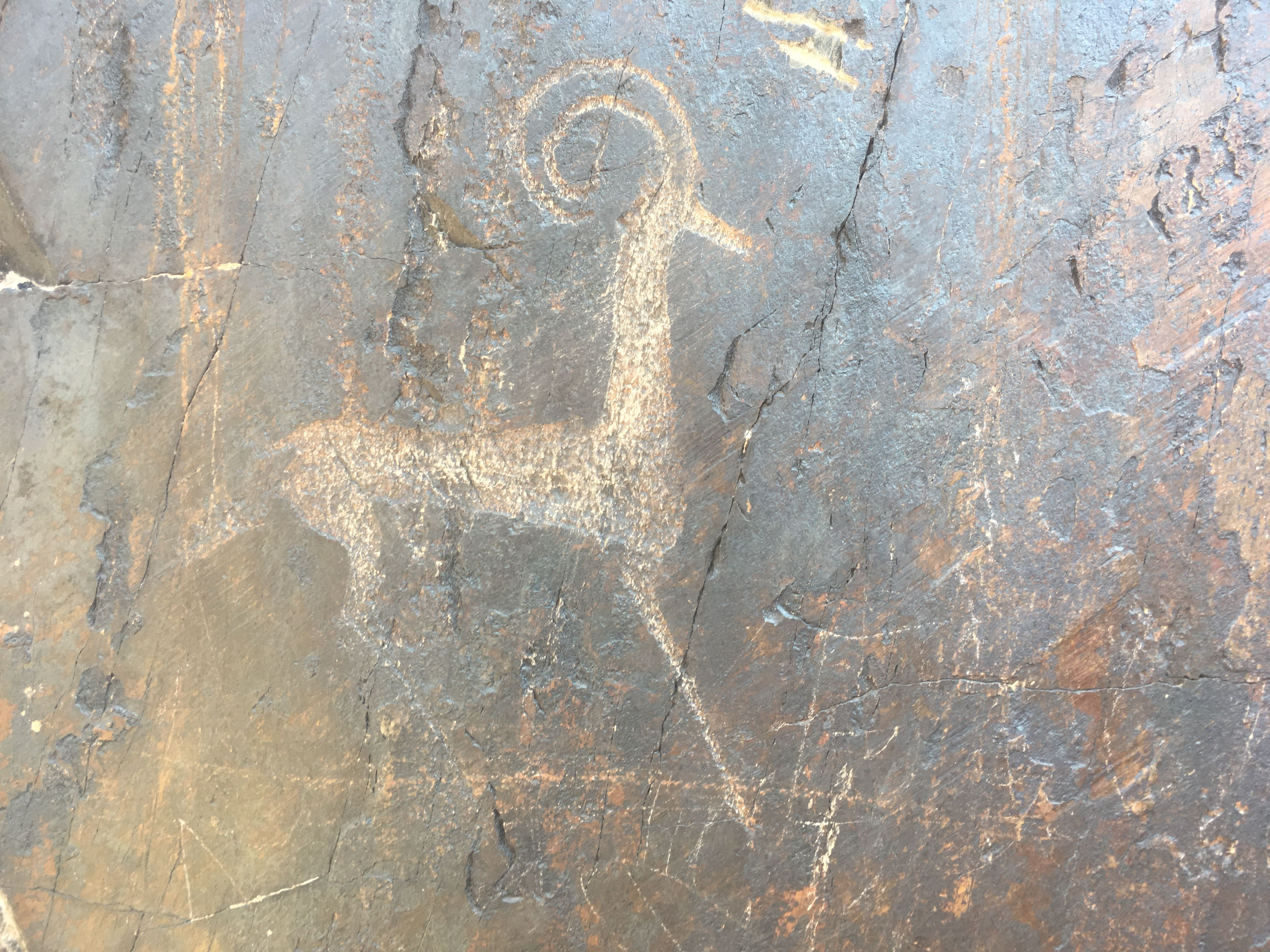
Animal petroglyph, Sarmishsay, Uzbekistan

The petroglyphs are spread along the gorge, but concentrated in two main areas. The oldest petroglyphs date from the 9th millennium BC, but they span a period of history right up to the 18th century AD. Unfortunately, there is also some modern graffiti.

The surface of darker rocks was polished, and that was used as a canvas by the ancient artists. Initially, they carved their artworks with stone chisels and other basic tools. Later artists would have had a greater variety of tools, including some made of metal, and also painted some of the designs.

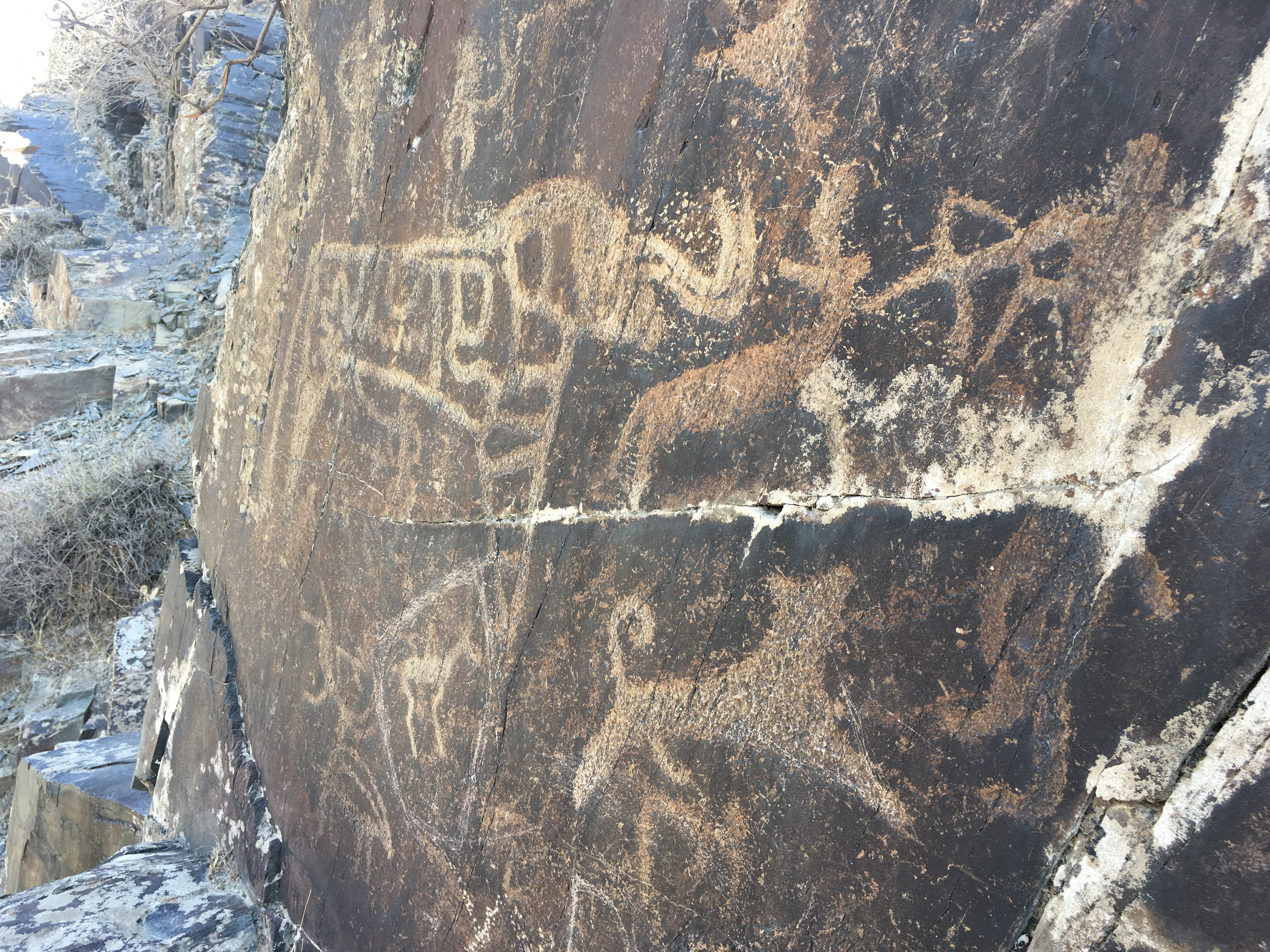
Animal petroglyphs, Sarmishsay, Uzbekistan

Most of the petroglyphs at Sarmishsay depict people and animals, including hunting scenes. Included amongst the animals are Saiga antelope, wild mountain sheep and goat, elephant, lion, tiger, and cheetah. The pictures of aurochs (wild cattle) are particularly important in helping archaeologists date the petroglyphs, as aurochs became extinct in this area from over-hunting in the 2nd millennium BC. Not all of the images are true to life: there is a camel with three humps, and a man with two heads. The petroglyphs made by Scythian artists during the Iron Age often show domesticated animals, which shows how society had developed by this time. There is an image of a shepherd on horseback, a Bactrian camel, and a dog, which might have been a pet. The Scythians also made artworks of religious rites, including ecstatic dances, religious symbols, and even Zoroastrian priests worshipping at a fire temple.

== Other sites ==
Archeologists have found a number of burial sites in Sarmishsay, and also pagan altars. These complement the petroglyphs showing religious rites such as animal sacrifices.

There is a children’s summer camp called Lager Sarmysh at one end of Sarmish Gorge. There is also a mountain yurt camp for tourists.

== See also ==
- Kyzyl Kum
- The Aydar Lake, large artificial lake
- Tourism in Uzbekistan
