= Chigirik =

- urban-type settlement
- Location in Uzbekistan
- Coordinates: 41°00′43″N 69°21′26″E
- Country: Uzbekistan
- Region: Tashkent Region
- City: Nurafshon
- Urban-type settlement: 1963

Population (1989)
  - Total: 2,929
- Time zone: UTC+5 (UZT)

Chigirik (Uzbek: Chigʻiriq/Чиғириқ, Russian: Чигирик) is an urban-type settlement in Tashkent Region, Uzbekistan. The town population in 1989 was 2,929 people. It is part of the city Nurafshon.
