= Yangihayot (Nurafshon) =

- urban-type settlement
- Location in Uzbekistan
- Coordinates: 41°00′04″N 69°21′56″E
- Country: Uzbekistan
- Region: Tashkent Region
- City: Nurafshon
- Urban-type settlement: 1973

Population (1989)
  - Total: 8,417
- Time zone: UTC+5 (UZT)

Yangihayot (Uzbek: Yangihayot/Янгиҳаёт, Russian: Янгихаят, romanized: Yangikhayat) is an urban-type settlement in Tashkent Region, Uzbekistan. The town population in 1989 was 8417 people. It is part of the city Nurafshon.
