= Syr Darya =

River in Central Asia

Syr Darya Jaxartes
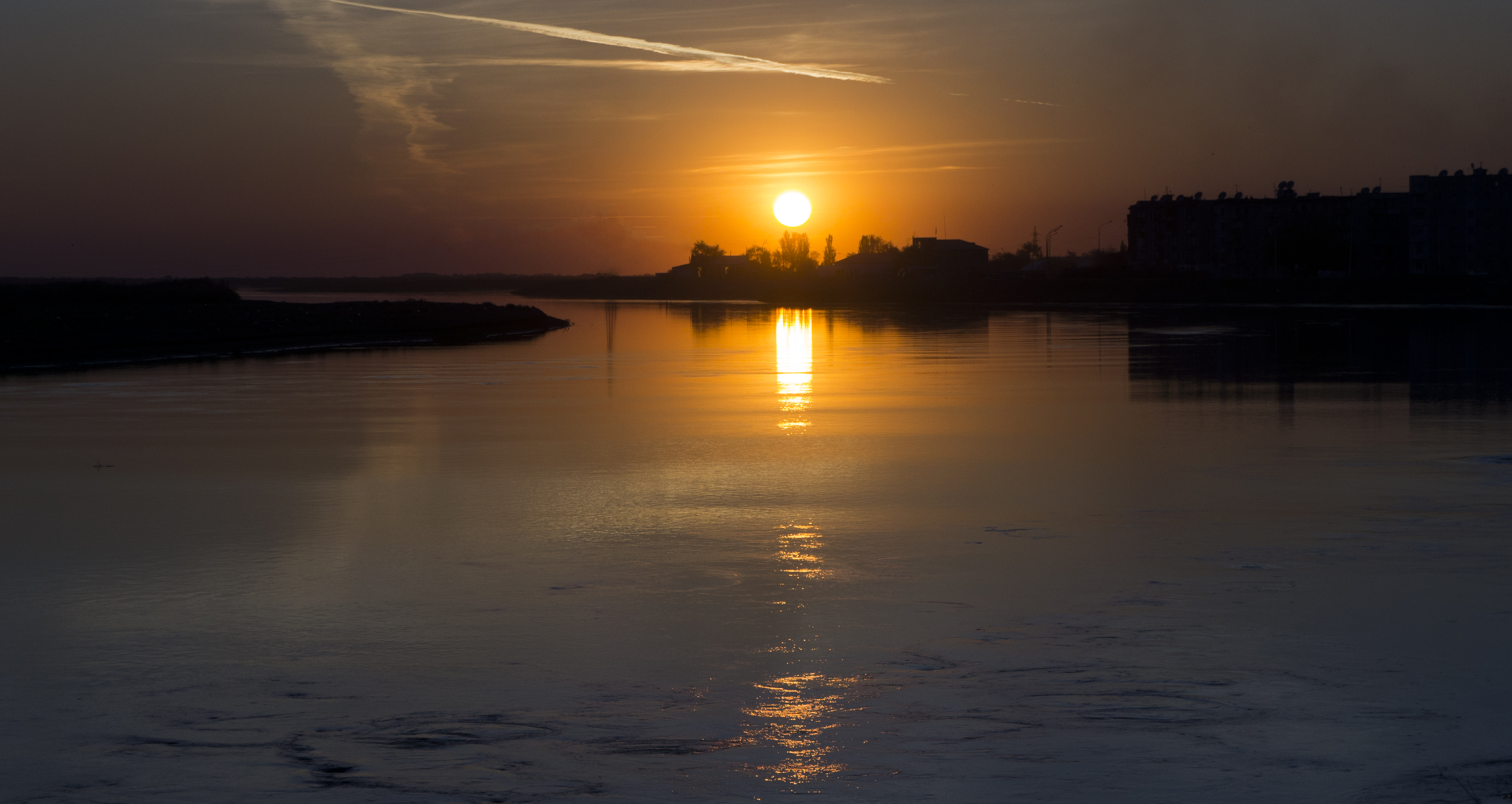
- Syr Darya at Kyzylorda, Kazakhstan

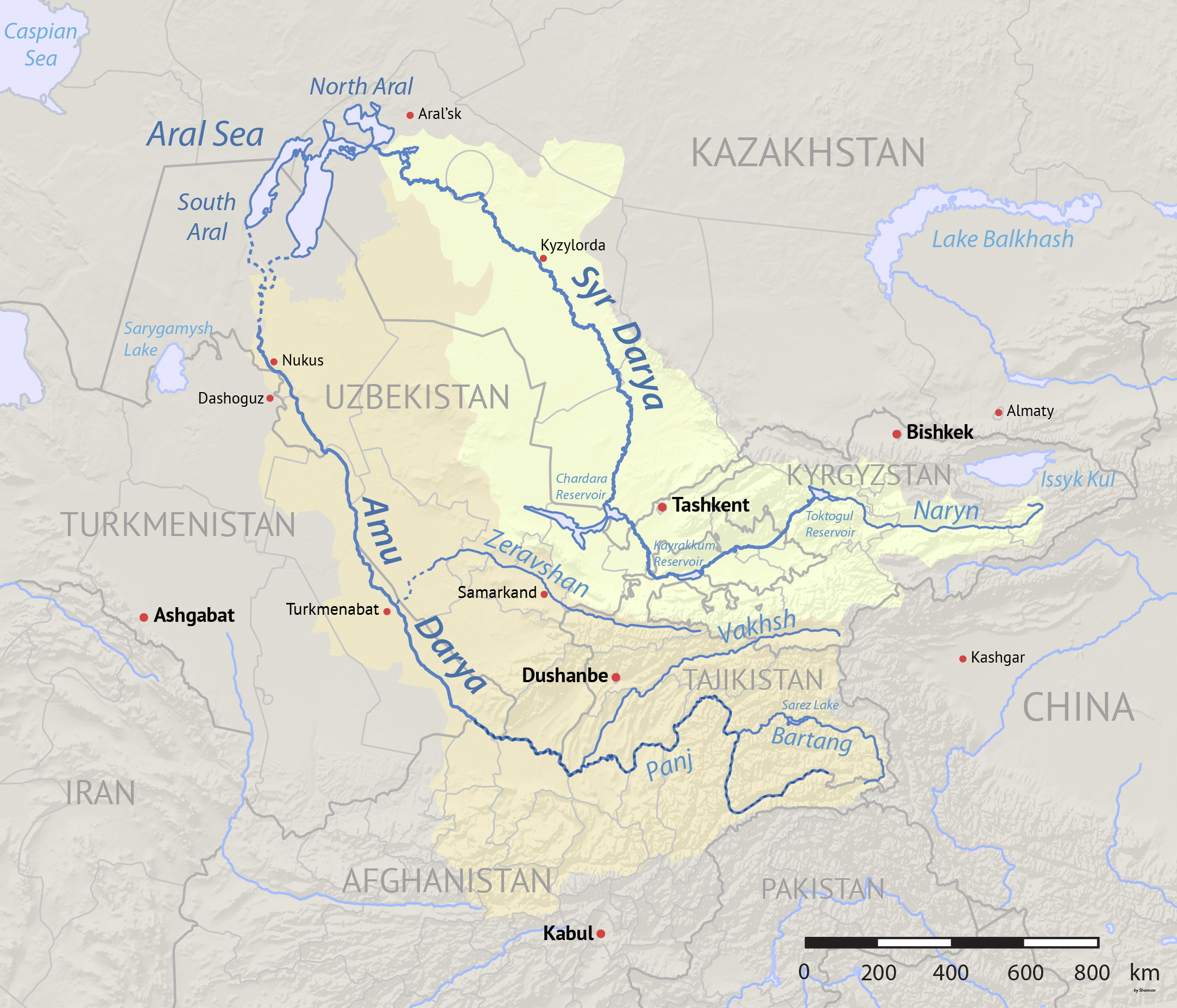
- Map of area around the Aral Sea. Aral Sea boundaries are c. 2008. The Syr Darya drainage basin is in yellow, and the Amu Darya basin in orange.
- Native name: Syrdaria (Kazakh); Сырдарыя (Kyrgyz); Sirdaryo (Uzbek); Сирдарё (Tajik)

Location
- Country: Kyrgyzstan, Uzbekistan, Tajikistan, Kazakhstan
- Cities: Khujand, TJ, Tashkent, UZ, Turkestan, KZ, Kyzylorda, KZ, Baikonur, KZ

Physical characteristics
- Source: Confluence of Naryn and Kara Darya
  - location: Fergana Valley, Uzbekistan
  - coordinates: 40°54′03″N 71°45′27″E
  - elevation: 400 m (1,300 ft)
- Mouth: North Aral Sea
  - location: Kazaly, Kazakhstan
  - coordinates: 46°09′15″N 60°52′25″E
  - elevation: 42 m (138 ft)
- Length: 2,256.25 km (1,401.97 mi)
- Basin size: 402,760 km^{2} (155,510 sq mi)
- Discharge
  - average: 1,180 m^{3}/s (42,000 cu ft/s)
  - minimum: 170 m^{3}/s (6,000 cu ft/s)
  - maximum: 3,900 m^{3}/s (140,000 cu ft/s)

Basin features
- Tributaries
  - left: Kara
  - right: Naryn, Chirciq, Arys, Sarysu
- Protection status

Ramsar Wetland
- Official name: Lesser Aral Sea and Delta of the Syrdarya River
- Designated: 2 February 2012
- Reference no.: 2083

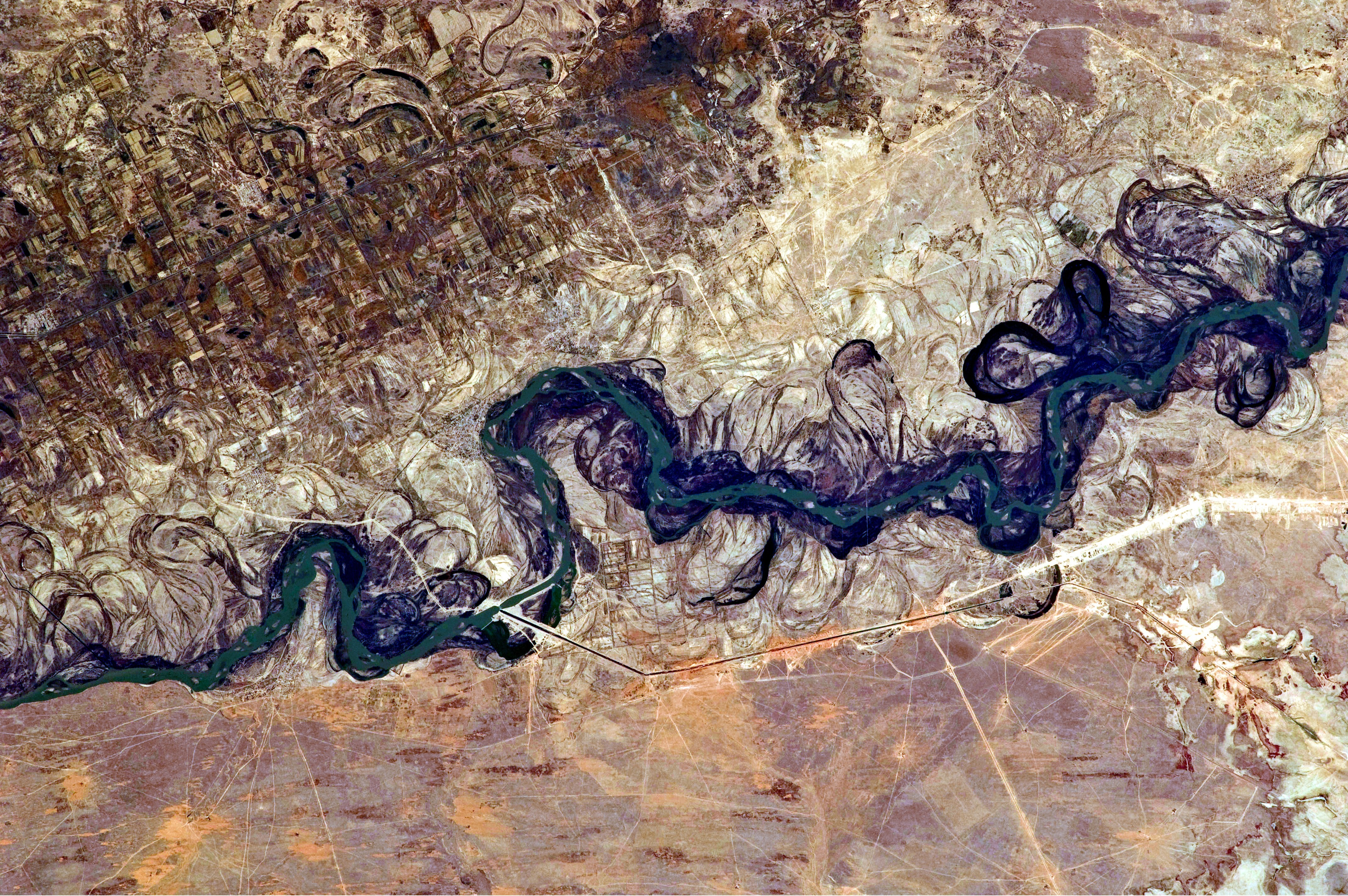
Astronaut photograph of the Syr Darya River floodplain

The Syr Darya, (Note: English: /ˌsɪər ˈdɑːriə/ seer DAR-ee-ə; Kazakh: Сырдария, romanized: Syrdaria, arabized: سىردارٸيا; Russian: Сырдарья, romanized: Syrdaria, pronounced [sɨrdɐˈrʲja]; Persian: سيردريا, romanized: Sirdaryâ, pronounced [ˌsiːɹ‿dæɹˈjɒː]; Tajik: Сирдарё, romanized: Sirdaryo, arabized: سيردريا, hebraized: סירדריא; Turkish: Seyhun; Arabic: سيحون, romanized: Sayḥūn, cyrillized: Сэйхьун; Uzbek: Sirdaryo, pronounced [sɪrdarˈjɒ]) historically known as the Jaxartes (/dʒækˈsɑːrtiːz/ jak-SAR-teez; Ancient Greek: Ἰαξάρτης), is a river in Central Asia. It originates in the Tian Shan mountains in Kyrgyzstan and eastern Uzbekistan, and flows for 2,256.25 kilometres (1,401.97 mi) west and north-west through Uzbekistan, Sughd province of Tajikistan, and southern Kazakhstan to the northern remnants of the Aral Sea. It is the northern and eastern of the two main rivers in the endorheic basin of the Aral Sea, the other being the Amu Darya.

During the Soviet era, extensive irrigation projects were constructed around both rivers, diverting their water into farmland and causing, during the post-Soviet era, the virtual disappearance of the Aral Sea, once the world's fourth-largest lake. The point at which the river flows from Tajikistan into Uzbekistan is, at 300 m (980 ft) above sea level, the lowest elevation in Tajikistan.

== Name ==
The word Syr (Сыр) in Tajik means “secret”. The second part of the name (darya, دریا) means "lake" or "sea" in Persian and "river" in Tajik. The current name dates only from the 18th century.

The earliest recorded name was Jaxartes or Iaxartes (Ἰαξάρτης) in Ancient Greek, consist of two morpheme Iaxa and artes, found in several sources, including those relating to Alexander the Great. This variant of the Greek name hearkens back to the Old Persian name Yakhsha Arta ("True Pearl"), perhaps a reference to the color of its glacially-fed water. However there is also usage of the name Tanais river in certain sources, such as those of Arrian, a possible usage of the actual Tanais River's name to represent a furthest east river by distance. More evidence for the Persian etymology comes from the river's Turkic name up to the time of the Arab conquest, the Yinçü ögüz (Old Turkic: 𐰘𐰨𐰇:𐰇𐰏𐰔), or "Pearl river", from Middle Chinese 眞珠 *t͡ɕiɪn-t͡ɕɨo. Tang Chinese also recorded this name as Yaosha River 藥殺水 (MC: *jɨɐk-ʃˠɛt) and later Ye River 葉河 (MC: *jiɛp).

The current local name of the river, Syr (Sïr), does not appear before the 16th century. In the 17th century, Abu al-Ghazi Bahadur Khan, historian and ruler of Khiva, called the Aral Sea the "Sea of Sïr," or Sïr Tengizi.

The important evidence is the etymology of the name of the Syr-Darya River mentioned by the ancient authors – '''Yaksart''', established by V. A. Livshits (2003: 10). It means ''''flowing' or 'streaming'.''' The word belongs to the Eastern Iranian Sogdian dialect that had emerged from the Saka language group.

== History ==
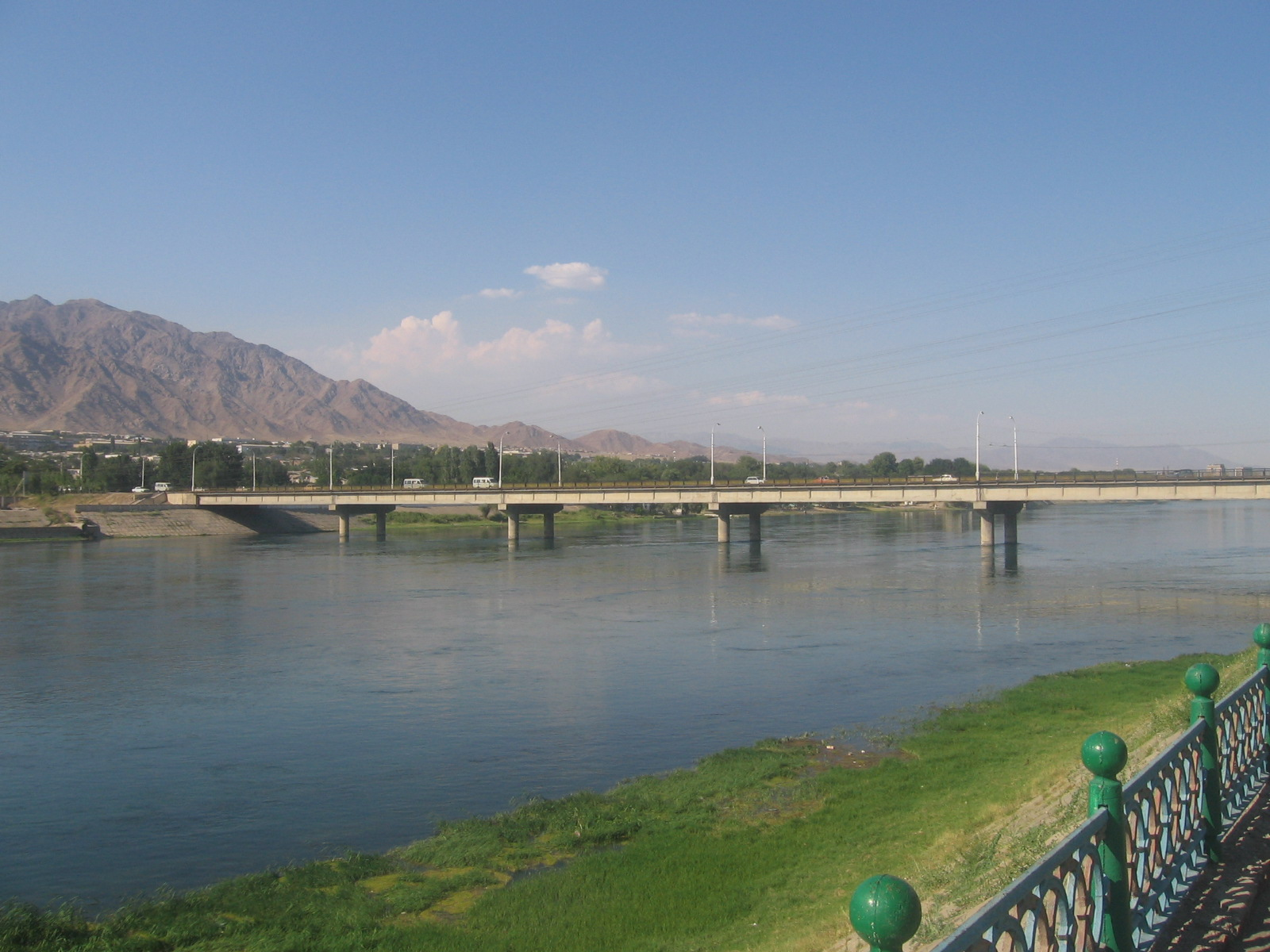
Syr Darya River at Khujand

When the Macedonian army of Alexander the Great reached the Jaxartes in 329 BC, after travelling through Bactria and Sogdia without encountering any opposition, they met with the first instances of native resistance to their presence. In October 329 BC the Macedonians fought the Battle of Jaxartes against the Saka, killing some 1,200 combatants including the leader of the nomads. Alexander was forced to retire south to deal with a revolt in Sogdia. Alexander was wounded in the fighting that ensued and the native tribes took to attacking the Macedonian garrisons stationed in their towns. As the revolt against Alexander intensified it spread through Sogdia, plunging it into two years of warfare, the intensity of which surpassed any other conflict of the Anabasis Alexandri.

On the shores of the Syr Darya, Alexander placed a garrison in the City of Cyrus (Cyropolis in Greek), which he then renamed after himself Alexandria Eschate—"Alexandria the furthest"—in 329 BC. For most of its history since at least the Muslim conquest of Central Asia in the 7th to 8th centuries AD, the name of this city (in present-day Tajikistan) has been Khujand.

In the mid-19th century, during the Russian conquest of Turkestan, the Russian Empire introduced steam navigation to the Syr Darya, initially from Fort Raim but with an important river port at Kazalinsk (Kazaly) from 1847 to 1882, when service ceased.

During the Soviet era, a resource-sharing system was instituted in which Kyrgyzstan and Tajikistan shared water originating from the Amu Darya and Syr Darya rivers with Kazakhstan, Turkmenistan, and Uzbekistan in summer. In return, Kyrgyzstan and Tajikistan received Kazakh, Turkmen, and Uzbek coal, gas, and electricity in winter. After the 1991 fall of the Soviet Union, this system disintegrated and the Central Asian nations have failed to reinstate it. Inadequate infrastructure, poor water-management, and outdated irrigation methods all exacerbate the issue.

In 2012, the Syrdarya–Turkestan State Regional Natural Park was opened in Kazakhstan, in hopes of protecting the river plain ecosystems, archaeological sites, and historical-cultural monuments, as well as plants and animal species, some of which are rare or endangered.

== Geography ==
Syr Darya River at Baikonur, Kazakhstan

The river rises in two headstreams in the Tian Shan Mountains in Kyrgyzstan and eastern Uzbekistan—the Naryn River and the Kara Darya which come together in the Uzbek part of the Fergana Valley—and flows for some 2,212 kilometres (1,374 mi) west and north-west through Uzbekistan and southern Kazakhstan to the remains of the Aral Sea. The Syr Darya drains an area of over 800,000 square kilometres (310,000 sq mi), but no more than 160,000 square kilometres (62,000 sq mi) actually contribute significant flow to the river: indeed, two of the largest rivers in its basin, the Talas and the Chu, dry up before reaching it. Its annual flow is a very modest 37 cubic kilometres (30,000,000 acre⋅ft; 8.9 mi^{3}) per year—half that of its sister river, the Amu Darya.

Along its course, the Syr Darya irrigates the most productive agricultural regions in Central Asia. After crossing the Kazakhstan–Uzbekistan border, Syr Darya meets the Shardara Dam, which is connected to the Aydar Lake. Syr Darya then flows north, before turning west and emptying into the North Aral Sea.

Various local governments throughout history have built and maintained an extensive system of canals. These canals are of central importance in this arid region. Many fell into disuse in the 17th and early 18th century, but the Khanate of Kokand rebuilt many in the 19th century, primarily along the Upper and Middle Syr Darya.

== Ecological damage ==
Massive expansion of irrigation canals in Middle and Lower Syr Darya during the Soviet period to water cotton and rice fields caused ecological damage to the area. The amount of water taken from the river was such that in some periods of the year, no water at all reached the Aral Sea. The Amu Darya in Uzbekistan and Turkmenistan faced a similar situation.

The uranium concentration of the stream water is increased in Tajikistan with values of 43 μg/L and 12 μg/L; the WHO guideline value for drinking water of 30 μg/L is partly exceeded. The main input of uranium occurs upstream in Uzbekistan and Kyrgyzstan.

== See also ==
- Extreme points of Tajikistan
- History of the central steppe
- Great Fergana Canal
- Daryalyktakyr
- Jaxartosaurus
