= Aydar Lake =

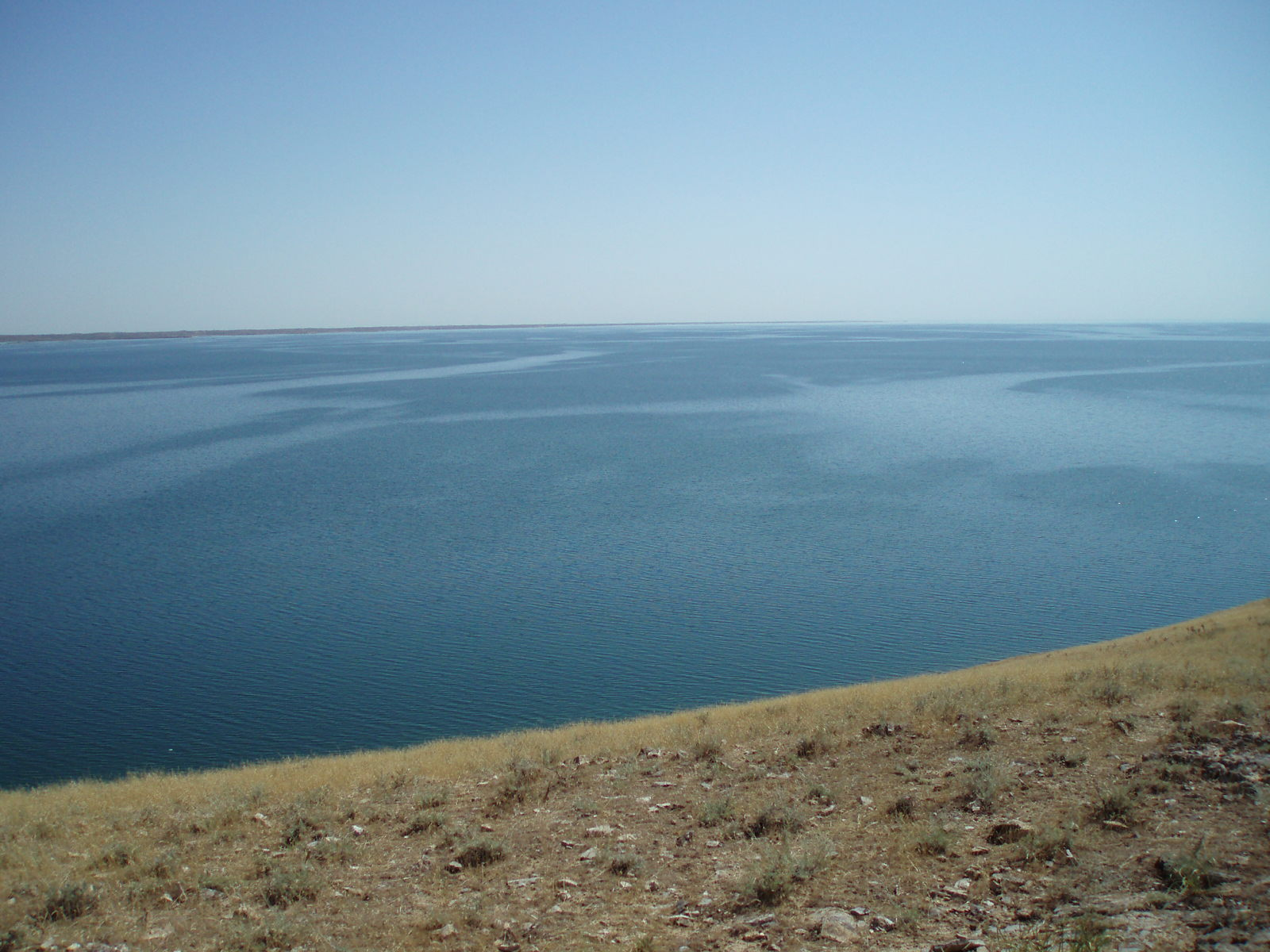

- Location within Uzbekistan
- Interactive map of Aydar Lake
- Location: Kyzyl Kum
- Coordinates: 40°55′00″N 66°48′00″E
- Lake type: artificial lake
- Basin countries: Uzbekistan
- Max. length: 250 km (160 mi)
- Max. width: 15 km (9.3 mi)
- Surface area: 3,000 km^{2} (1,200 sq mi)
- Water volume: 44.3 km^{3} (10.6 cu mi)

Ramsar Wetland
- Official name: Aydar-Arnasay Lakes system
- Designated: 20 October 2008
- Reference no.: 1841

The Aydar Lake (Uzbek: Aydar Ko‘li, Айдар кўли; Haydar ko‘li, Ҳайдар кўли; alternate spellings: Lake Aydarkul, Lake Aidarkul) is part of the man-made Aydar-Arnasay system of lakes, which covers 4,000 square kilometres (1,500 mi^{2}). This has 3 brackish water lakes (the two others being Arnasay and Tuzkan), deep basins of the south-eastern Kyzyl Kum (now in Uzbekistan and Kazakhstan). The lakes are expansive reservoirs of Soviet planning.

Being brackish rather than saline they have high rates of evaporation, prompting a moist summer microclimate, often attracting rain clouds, which has led to the replenishment of the North Aral Sea. It is also known as sea in the sand due to its wide sandy beaches and clean salty water.

== Diversions and Reservoirs above the South and North Aral Seas ==
The system now provides close to original flows into the North (Small) Aral Sea, by which dams are being built to divorce the south, accelerating its recovery.

The south of Uzbekistan and north of Turkmenistan are considerably split by the Amu Darya, the river that is occasionally dry at its mouth today and which fed the South Aral Sea (as its sole river source). Among its diversions is Sarygamysh Lake west of Uzbekistan. It is 70 cubic kilometers, tapped from the lower river. The Amu Darya's turning over to irrigation and the lake mentioned (which sits much lower) denies the South Aral Sea most of its former inflow, provoking the latter's drying up, but enabling central Turkmenistan, among other zones, to have imported sources of river water.

== Background ==
Up to the middle of the last century, the Arnasay lowland remained a dry salt pan most of the year. Only in Spring, in the lowlands, would the small, ephemeral Lake Tuzkan glisten briefly, disappearing in the hot weather.

In the early sixties the Syr Darya was dammed up. Simultaneously the Shardara Dam was constructed. Floodgates were provided in the dam for flood control. In 1969 they were opened during a raging flood. Between February 1969 and February 1970 almost 60% of the Syr Darya's average flow (21 km^{3}) was drained from the Shardara Reservoir into the Arnasay lowland. In such a way new lakes were made. Since 1969 the Aydar Lake has regularly received the waters of the Syr Darya River when they overflow the capacity of the Shardara Reservoir. This has gradually filled up the natural cavity of Arnasay lowland to create the third largest lake in Central Asia after Issyk Kul in Kyrgyzstan, and the Caspian Sea.

In 2005, the Aydar Lake contained 44.3 cubic kilometers of water. The lake covers 3,000 km^{2} (1,200 sq mi). It is nearly 250 km (160 mi) long and up to 15 km (9.3 mi) wide. The mineralization of the water averages 2 grams per liter (2,000 ppm).

The lake's immediate surroundings are rural and sparsely inhabited. As at the year 2010 about 345 families or 1,760 people were living there.

The region adjacent to the Kyzylkum Desert is of great potential for fishing, yurting and camel-riding tourist activities.

== Species ==
Its many fish include the Sazan (Cyprinus carpio), Pike perch (Stizostedion lucioperca), Bream (Abramis brama), Cat-fish (Silurus glanis), Asp (Aspius aspius), Chehon (Pelecus cultratus), Ophidian fish (Channa argus) were introduced to the lake, which nowadays works as a source of industrial fishing. The lake system provides between 760 and 2,000 tonnes of fish annually (according to statistical data between 1994 and 2001).

In addition to fauna common in the Kyzyl Kum, there are many kinds of water birds migrating from the Aral Sea that make their homes around the lake.

== See also ==
- Kyzyl Kum
- Sarmishsay, ancient monuments of anthropogenic activity
- Tourism in Uzbekistan
