= Tuzkan Lake =

Lake Tuzkan, located in the eastern part of Uzbekistan

- Tuzkon
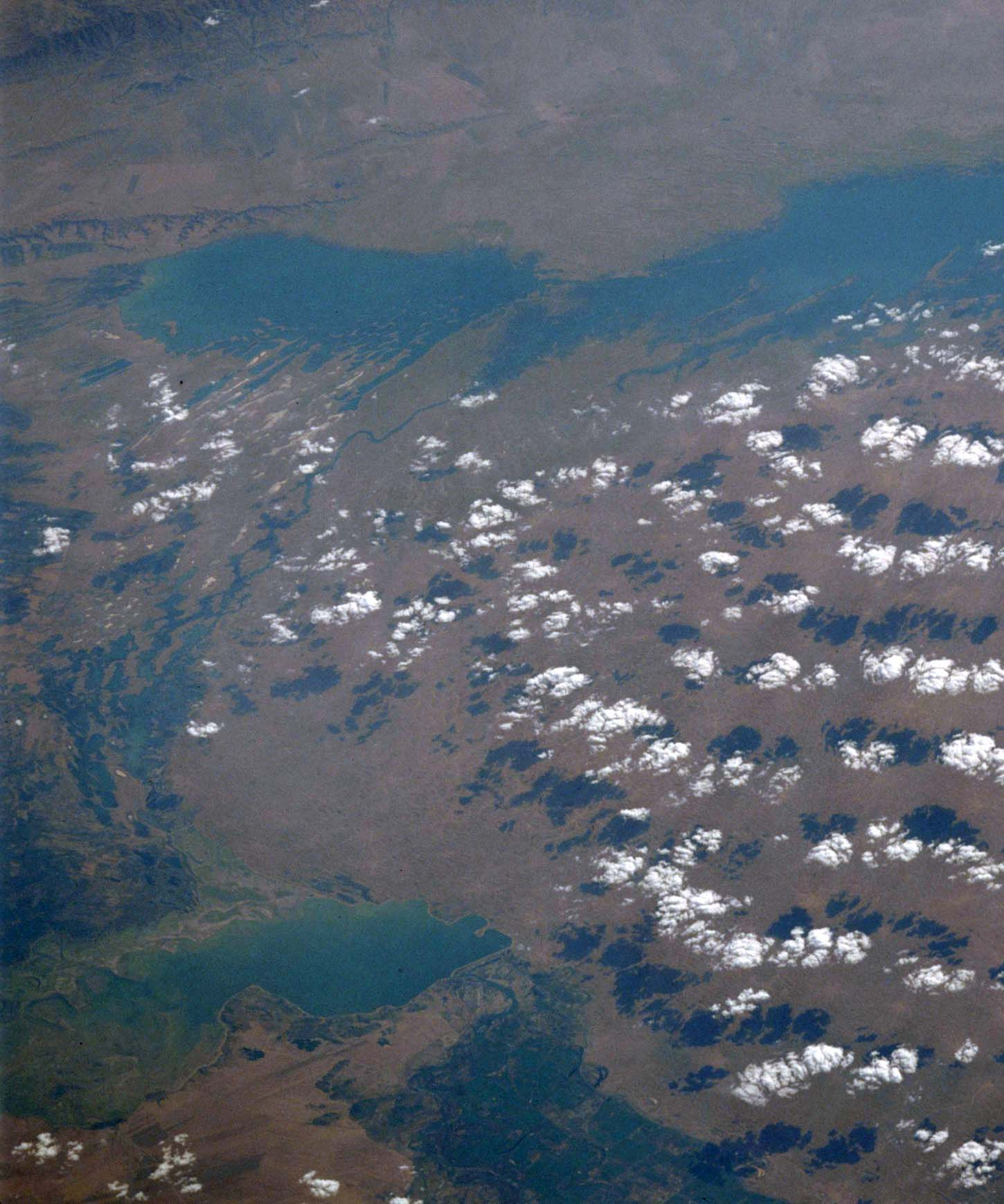
- Photo taken in 1985; looking south: Lake Tuzkan with Nuratau mountains at top left, Lake Aydar at right, Syrdarja valley in front, Shardara Reservoir and Arnasay Lakes
- Interactive map of Tuzkan Lake
- Location: Kysylkum Desert in Uzbekistan
- Coordinates: 40°35′43″N 67°29′28″E
- Type: Lake
- Primary inflows: Diverted water from the Syrdarja, Kyly, wastewater collectors from the Golodnaya steppe
- Primary outflows: drainless (basin location)
- Max. length: 35 kilometres (22 mi)
- Max. width: 20 kilometres (12 mi)
- Surface area: Originally approx. 30 km², today up to 705 km² (2011)
- Max. depth: 40 mi (64.37 km)
- Surface elevation: Today up to 247 m (2011), originally a maximum of 237 m
- Settlements: Jizzax, Uchkulach

Ramsar Wetland
- Official name: Aydar-Arnasay Lakes system
- Designated: 20 October 2008
- Reference no.: 1841

Lake Tuzkan (Uzbek: Tuzkon, Cyrillic: Тузкан) is a former endorheic (drainless) lake located in southeastern Kyzylkum, Uzbekistan. It lies within the territory of Jizzakh Region (Viloyat Jizzax) and forms part of the Aydar-Arnasay lake system, which collectively spans an area of approximately 4,000 km².

== Prehistory ==
Until the mid-20th century, Lake Tuzkan, which once reached a maximum recorded depth of 237 meters, was fed exclusively by the Kyly River during the spring snowmelt. This seasonal inflow caused temporary water accumulation, but the lake would typically evaporate during the hot summer months. Unlike other nearby lakes—many of which were artificially created or expanded through human activities such as drainage and irrigation infrastructure in the Mirzachoʻl steppe—Lake Tuzkan is of natural origin.

== Development in the modern era ==
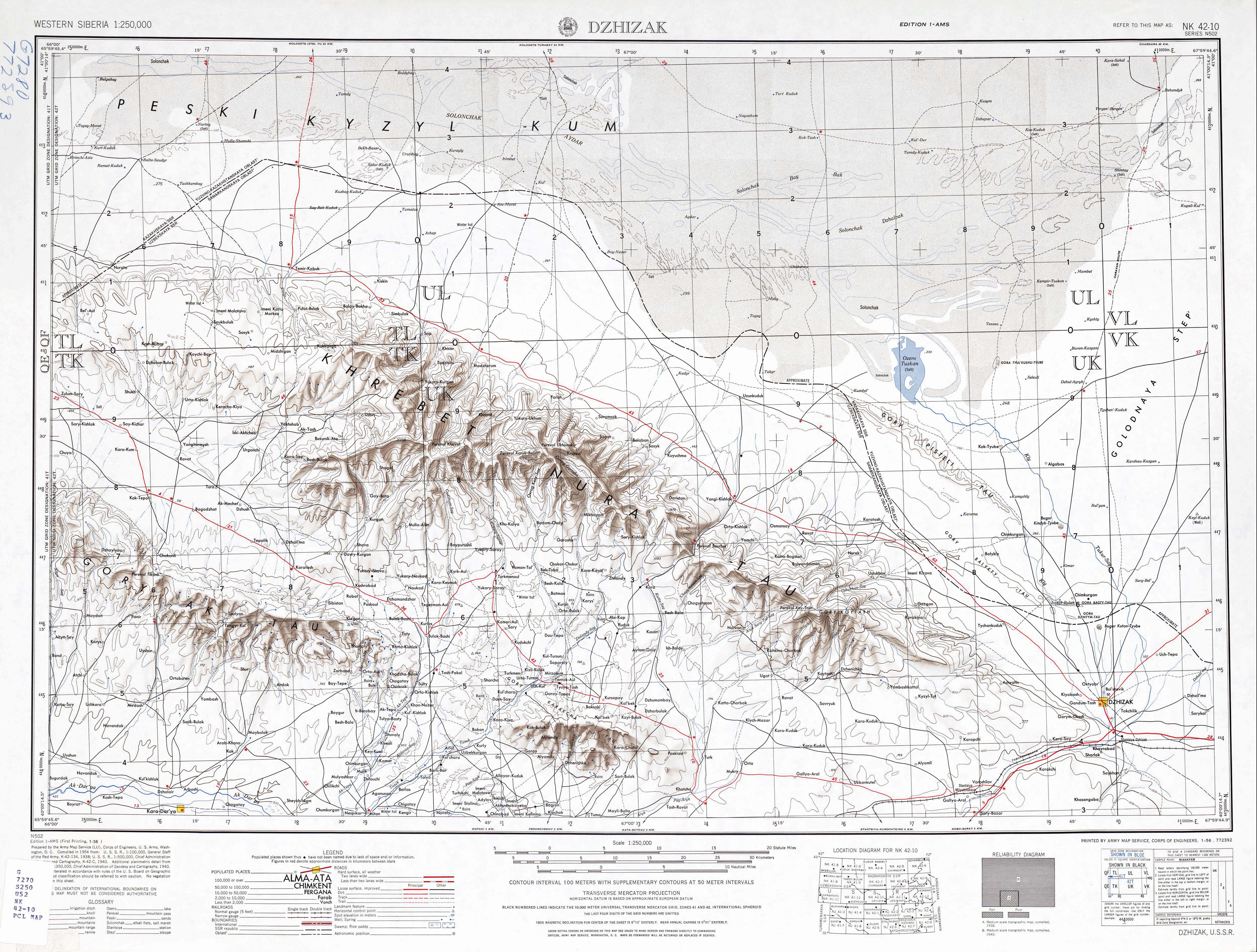
Map of the area from 1954; Lake Tuzkan as a saltwater lake without drainage

In the early 1960s, the Syr Darya River was dammed, and the Shardara Dam was built just behind the border with Kazakhstan. As a flood control measure, the dam was equipped with an emergency overflow channel into the Arnasay lowlands. This system was intended to mitigate risks of overcapacity during periods of high discharge. In 1969, during a severe flood, the emergency overflow had to be activated as the reservoir’s capacity proved insufficient to handle the volume of water. Between February 1969 and February 1970, nearly 60% of the Syr Darya’s average annual discharge—approximately 22 km³—was diverted into the Arnasay lowlands. This large-scale redirection of water reached Lake Tuzkan, dramatically increasing its surface area and volume. These unregulated inflows had a destabilizing effect on the lake’s ecosystem, leading to extensive flooding, followed later by episodes of drying, which disrupted the lake's natural balance. In an attempt to mitigate further ecological impact, a weir was constructed in 1980 at the junction between Lake Tuzkan and Lake Aydar, intended to regulate water inflow into Tuzkan.

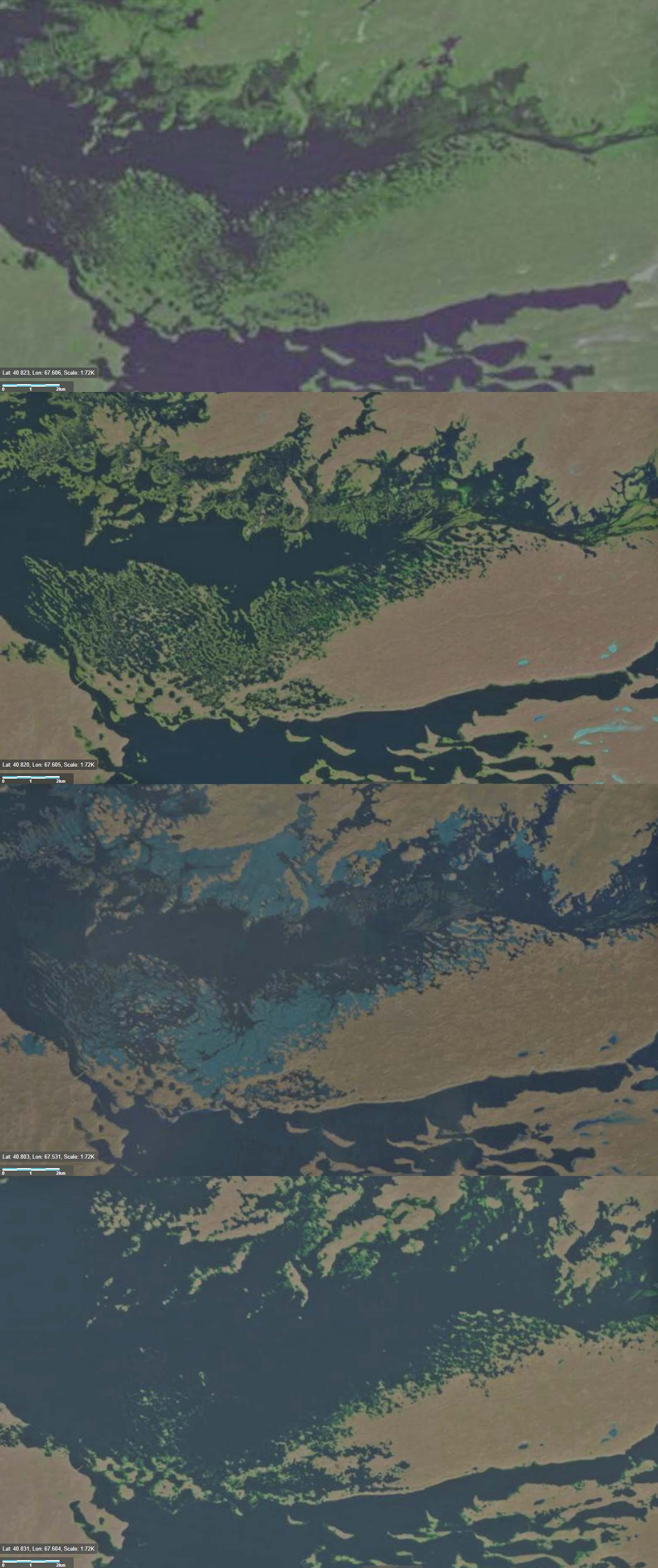
Rise in lake level: 1 October 1969 (239.4 m), 26 September 1993 (238.8 m), 1 February 1994 (approx. 241 m), 29 September 1994 (241.6 m)

However, in the winter of 1992–1993, heavy snowmelt caused the lake’s water level to rise by approximately two meters within a single month. A subsequent snowmelt in the spring of 1994 led to a further rise of three meters, bringing the lake’s depth to around 242 meters. As a result, the land bridge between Lake Tuzkan and Lake Aydar, along with the weir, was completely submerged. Since that event, Lake Tuzkan has effectively merged with Lake Aydar, and no clear boundary now exists between the two bodies of water.

== Geography and bathymetry ==
Lake Tuzkan is bordered to the east by the Mirzachoʻl steppe, and to the north, it adjoins the former Aydar salt pan, now Lake Aydar. The lake currently spans an area of approximately 705 km², with an average depth ranging between 20 and 40 metres. Following the submersion of the land bridge separating it from Lake Aydar, the water level of Lake Tuzkan has synchronized with that of Lake Aydar and fluctuates seasonally. The average water temperature is 0.2°C in January, 13.2°C in April, 27.5°C in July, and 16.4°C in October. The salinity of the lake ranges between 4.0 and 4.9 g/l, roughly double the salinity found in Lake Aydar. This elevated salinity is largely attributed to the influx of salt-laden wastewater in the lake’s northeastern section. Despite these conditions, a modest local fishery has developed in the area.

== Nature conservation ==
In addition to the characteristic fauna of the Kyzylkum Desert, Lake Tuzkan serves as a vital habitat for a wide range of water birds, many of which began migrating to the area following the formation of Lake Aydar. The region is recognized as an Important Bird Area (IBA) and is listed under the Ramsar Convention on Wetlands of International Importance.

Situated at the intersection of the Afro-Eurasian and Central Asian migratory flyways, the lake is a key site for the migration and wintering of waterfowl, supporting over 100 bird species. It provides crucial habitat for several endangered or vulnerable species, such as the white-headed duck (Oxyura leucocephala), the steppe lapwing (Chettusia gregaria), the Dalmatian pelican (Pelecanus crispus), the red-breasted goose (Rufibrenta ruficollis), the lesser white-fronted goose (Anser erytropus), and the banded white-tailed eagle (Haliaetus leucoryphus). The lake also serves as an important spawning ground and feeding area for various fish species. Vegetation in the area includes reed belts, halophytic (salt-tolerant) plants, and tamarisk trees, which are used by local communities for various purposes. An ecological action plan aimed at preserving the region’s environmental stability was implemented for the years 2008–2015.

== Nuclear energy ==
In December 2017, the governments of Uzbekistan and Russia announced a strategic partnership in the development of nuclear energy. On 10 July 2018, both parties formalized an agreement to construct two nuclear power plant units, each with a capacity of 1,200 MW, for a total cost of USD 11 billion.

Between August 2018 and March 2019, four potential sites were evaluated, and a location west of Lake Tuzkan, in the Forish district, was identified as the most suitable for the construction of the new Uzbek nuclear power plant. On 17 May 2019, a contract for the development concept was signed with Atomstroyexport, the energy division of the Russian state-owned company Rosatom, and a site licence was expected to be issued in autumn 2020.

In July 2019, Minister Sultanov clarified that instead of two, four units of the Russian VVER-1200 type reactors would be built. The commissioning of the first two reactors is planned for 2028 and 2030.

== See also ==
- Tourism in Uzbekistan
- Kyzylkum Desert
