= List of lakes of Benin =

This is a list of lakes of Benin, located completely or partially within the country's borders.

== Lakes ==
- Lake Ahémé
- Lake Aziri
- Lake Nokoué
- Lake Porto Novo
- Lake Sele
- Lake Toho
- Togbadji Lagoon
