= Tuyaboʻgʻiz =

- urban-type settlement
- Location in Uzbekistan
- Coordinates: 40°59′52″N 69°18′15″E
- Country: Uzbekistan
- Region: Tashkent Region
- District: Oʻrtachirchiq District
- Urban-type settlement: 1957

Population (1989)
  - Total: 4,895
- Time zone: UTC+5 (UZT)

Tuyaboʻgʻiz (Uzbek: Tuyaboʻgʻiz/Туябўғиз) is an urban-type settlement in Tashkent Region, Uzbekistan. It is part of Oʻrtachirchiq District. The town population in 1989 was 4895 people.

== See also ==
- Tuyabuguz Reservoir
