= Oʻrtachirchiq District =

Coordinates: 41.0429°N 69.3574°E

Oʻrtachirchiq
- District
- Oʻrtachirchiq tumani
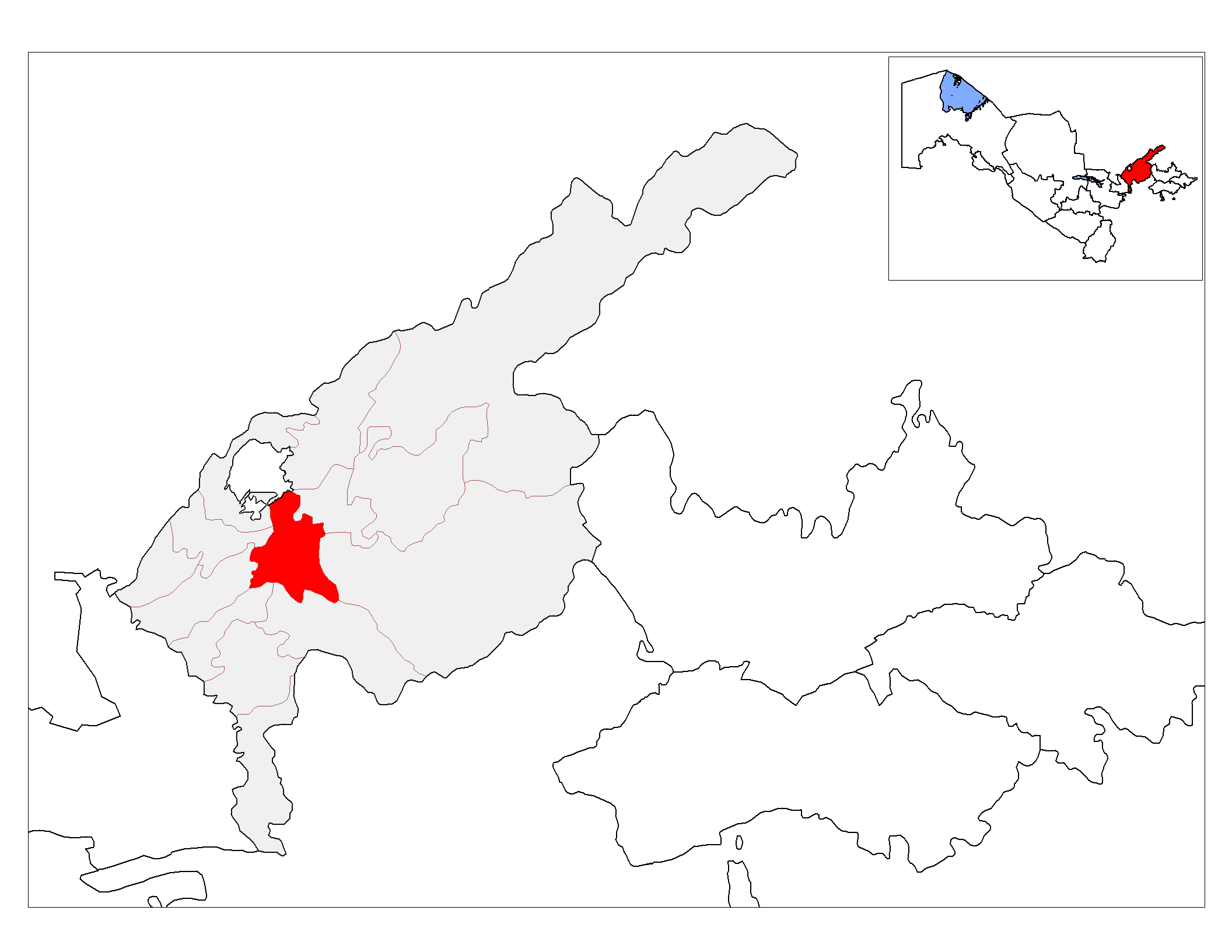
- Country: Uzbekistan
- Region: Tashkent Region
- Capital: Nurafshon
- Established: 1926

Area
  - Total: 460 km^{2} (180 sq mi)

Population (2021)
  - Total: 142,500
  - Density: 310/km^{2} (800/sq mi)
- Time zone: UTC+5 (UZT)

Oʻrtachirchiq is a district of Tashkent Region in Uzbekistan. The capital lies at the city Nurafshon, itself not part of the district. It has an area of 460 km^{2} (180 sq mi) and it had 142,500 inhabitants in 2021. The district consists of 4 urban-type settlements (Tuyaboʻgʻiz, Kuchluk, Qorasuv, Sholikor) and 13 rural communities (Angor, Qumovul, Qorasuv, Oq ota, Haqiqat, Navoiy nomli, Yoʻngʻichqala, Paxtaobod, Paxtakor, Oʻrtasaroy, Istiqbol, Yangi turmush, Uyshun).
