= Tuyabuguz Reservoir =

Tuyabuguz Reservoir Dam
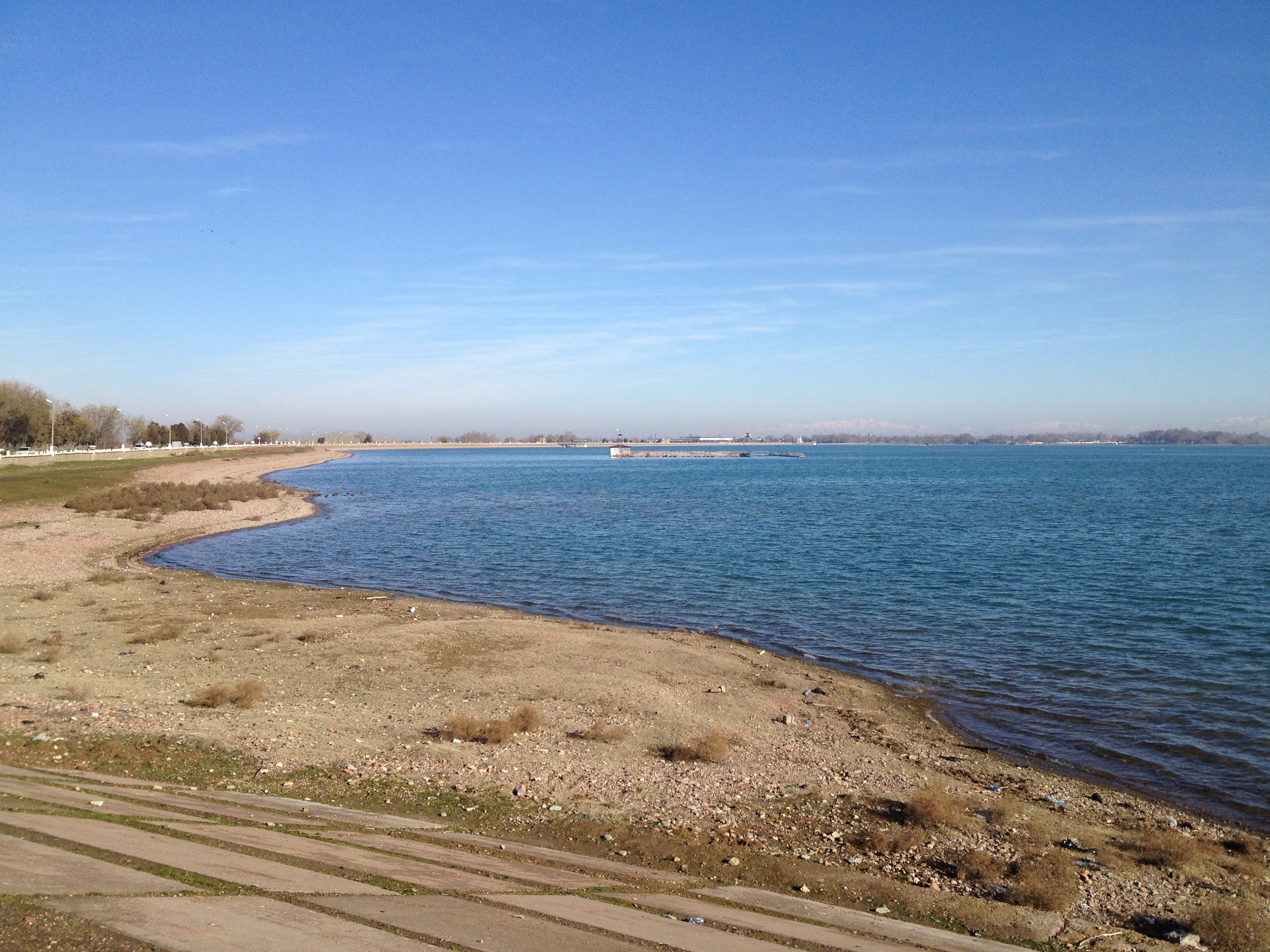
- Tuyabuguz Reservoir near dam

- Location within Uzbekistan
- Interactive map of Tuyabuguz Reservoir Dam
- Country: Uzbekistan
- Location: Tuyabuguz Village, Tashkent Province
- Coordinates: 41°00′00″N 69°18′08″E
- Construction began: 1955
- Opening date: 1964

Dam and spillways
- Impounds: Akhangaran river
- Length: 13,000–15,000 m (43,000–49,000 ft)
- Width (base): 3,000 m (9,800 ft)

Reservoir
- Creates: Tuyabuguz Reservoir; Tuyabogoz suv ombori

Tuyabuguz Reservoir (Uzbek: Туябугоз сув омбори), also known as the Tashmore or Tashkentskoye more (Russian: Ташкентское море) is artificial lake located in Tashkent Province, 30 km (19 mi) south of Tashkent, Uzbekistan. The urban settlement of Tuyaboʻgʻiz is situated on the dam's northern end. The reservoir provides irrigation for Tashkent Province.
