= List of lakes named Lone Star Lake =

Lone Star Lake may refer to:

- Lone Star Lake in Kansas
- Lone Star Lake, Marshall County, Texas
- Lone Star Lake, Paris County, Texas
- Lone Star Lakes Park, Suffolk, Virginia
- Lone Star Lake, a lake in Burnett County, Wisconsin
