= Chitta Katha Lake =

Alpine/Glacial lake in Azad Jammu and Kashmir

- چٹہ کٹھہ جھیل
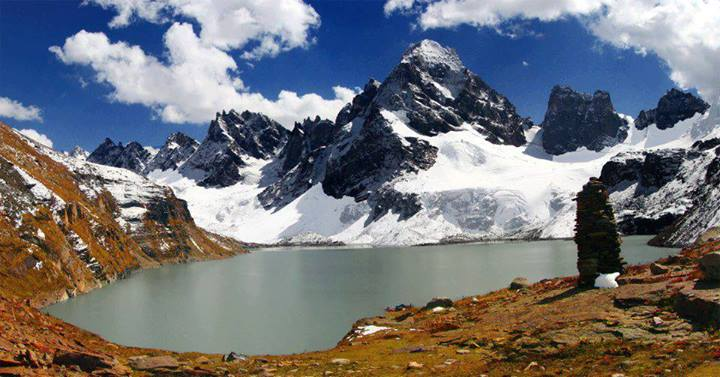
- Chitta Katha Lake, Shounter valley

- Location within Pakistan
- Location: Azad Kashmir, Pakistan
- Coordinates: 34°55′8″N 74°31′18″E
- Type: Alpine/Glacial lake
- Basin countries: Pakistan
- Surface elevation: 4,100 metres (13,500 ft)

Chitta Katha Lake (Urdu: چٹہ کٹھہ جھیل) is an alpine lake in Shounter Valley, Azad Kashmir, Pakistan, at an elevation of 4,100 metres (13,500 ft). From Kulga Kel there is a 20 km (12 mi) jeep track followed by a 5 km (3.1 mi) tourist track.

== See also ==
- Ratti Gali Lake
- Saral Lake
