= List of lakes of Zambia =

Lakes founded in Northern province of zambia

This is a list of lakes in Zambia.

== B ==
- Lake Bangweulu
- Lake Blue Water

== I ==
- Lake Ishiba Ng'andu

== K ==
- Lake Kariba
- Lake Kashiba

== M ==
- Mofwe Lagoon
- Lake Mweru
- Lake Mweru Wantipa

== N ==
- Lake Ngwenya

== R ==
- Rift Valley lakes

== T ==
- Lake Tanganyika
