= Ratti Gali Lake =

Lake in gulam Kashmir, Pakistan

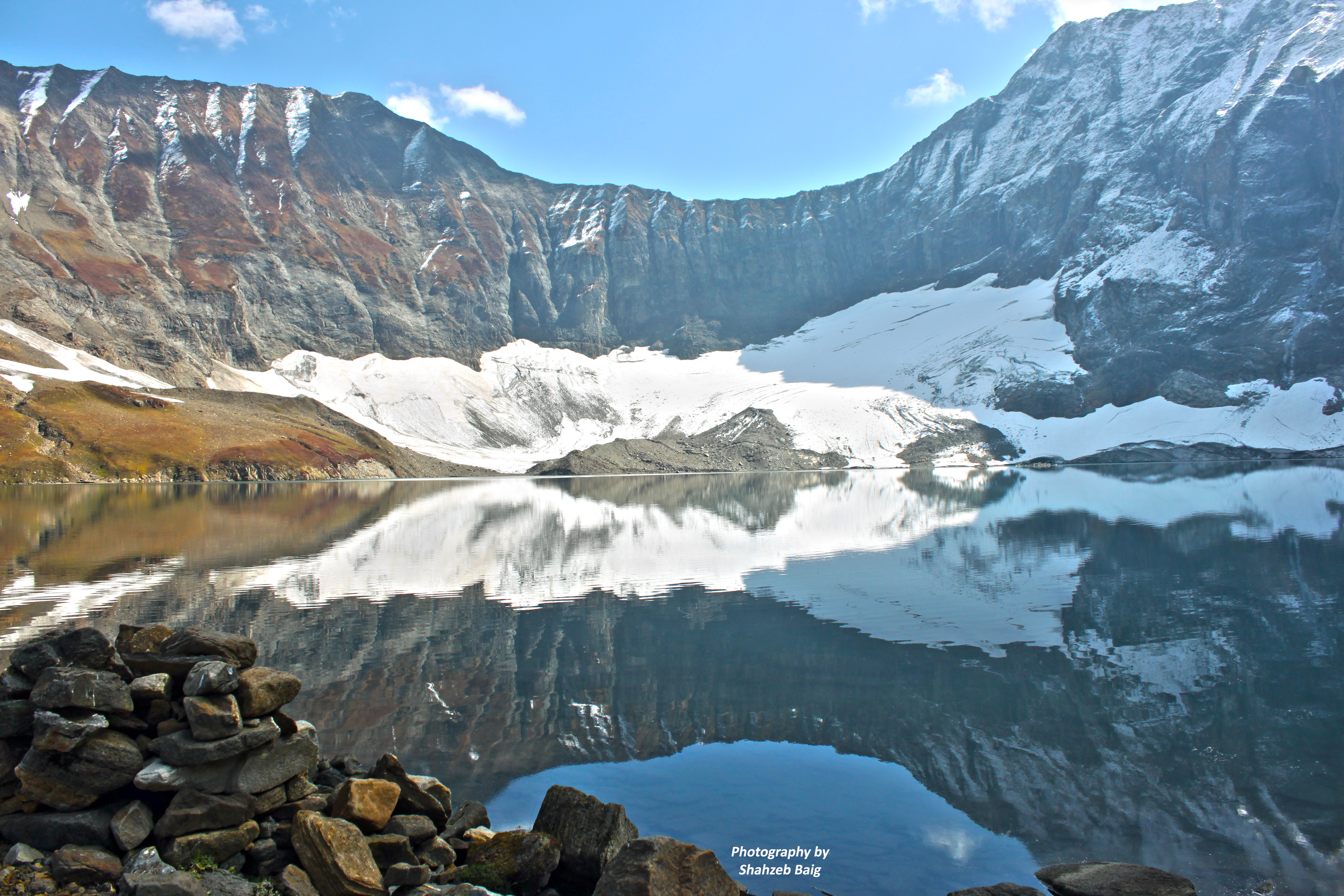
- Ratti Gali Lake in October

- Location within Azad Kashmir
- Location: Neelam Valley, Azad Kashmir
- Coordinates: 34.8302°N 74.0613°E
- Type: Alpine/Glacial lake
- Basin countries: Pakistan
- Residence time: July–September
- Surface elevation: 3,683 metres (12,083 ft)
- Settlements: Dowarian, Neelam Valley

Ratti Gali Lake is an alpine glacial lake which is located in Neelum Valley, Azad Kashmir, Pakistan . The lake is located at an altitude of 3,683 metres (12,083 ft). The lake is fed by the surrounding glacier waters of the mountains.

== Geography and location ==
Ratti Gali Lake is situated in the Neelum Valley, which is part of the greater Himalayan mountain range. The lake is fed by the glacial melt from the surrounding peaks, ensuring its crystal-clear blue waters remain cold throughout the year. The region is characterized by its rugged terrain, with steep cliffs and dense forests.

== Access and trekking ==
Access to Ratti Gali Lake typically involves a trek from the nearest village, Dowarian, which is located approximately 75 kilometres (47 mi) from the district headquarters of Athmuqam. From Dowarian, visitors embark on a 19-kilometer journey that can be traversed on foot or by hiring a jeep, depending on the road conditions and weather.

The trek to Ratti Gali Lake is a major attraction for adventure seekers, offering views of waterfalls, streams, and diverse flora and fauna. The path winds through both forests and meadows, gradually ascending to the lake's location.

== Flora and fauna ==
The region surrounding Ratti Gali Lake is home to a variety of plant and animal life. The alpine meadows are dotted with wildflowers such as primulas, potentillas, and gentians. The forests are inhabited by several bird species, including the Himalayan monal, a brightly colored pheasant. Mammals like the Himalayan brown bear and the Kashmir stag can also be found in the area, though they are more elusive.

== Tourism and conservation ==
Ratti Gali Lake has become a tourist destination in recent years, attracting both domestic and international visitors. However, the increase in tourism has raised concerns about environmental impact, leading to calls for sustainable tourism practices and conservation efforts to preserve the natural environment.

== Accidents ==
Out of the total 18 kilometres (11 mi) road leading to the base of lake, 16 kilometers are covered on jeeps which accommodate over a dozen people during each trip. In July 2024, a tourist jeep fell into the river leaving two tourists dead. Eight tourists were successfully rescued while bodies of three individuals were missing. Meanwhile, the driver jumped out of the jeep when he lost control over it. The government banned the jeeps pending the issuance of fitness certificates and improvement of road condition.

== See also ==
- Chitta Katha Lake
- Saral Lake
