= Shardara Dam =

Dam in Shardara, Kazakhstan

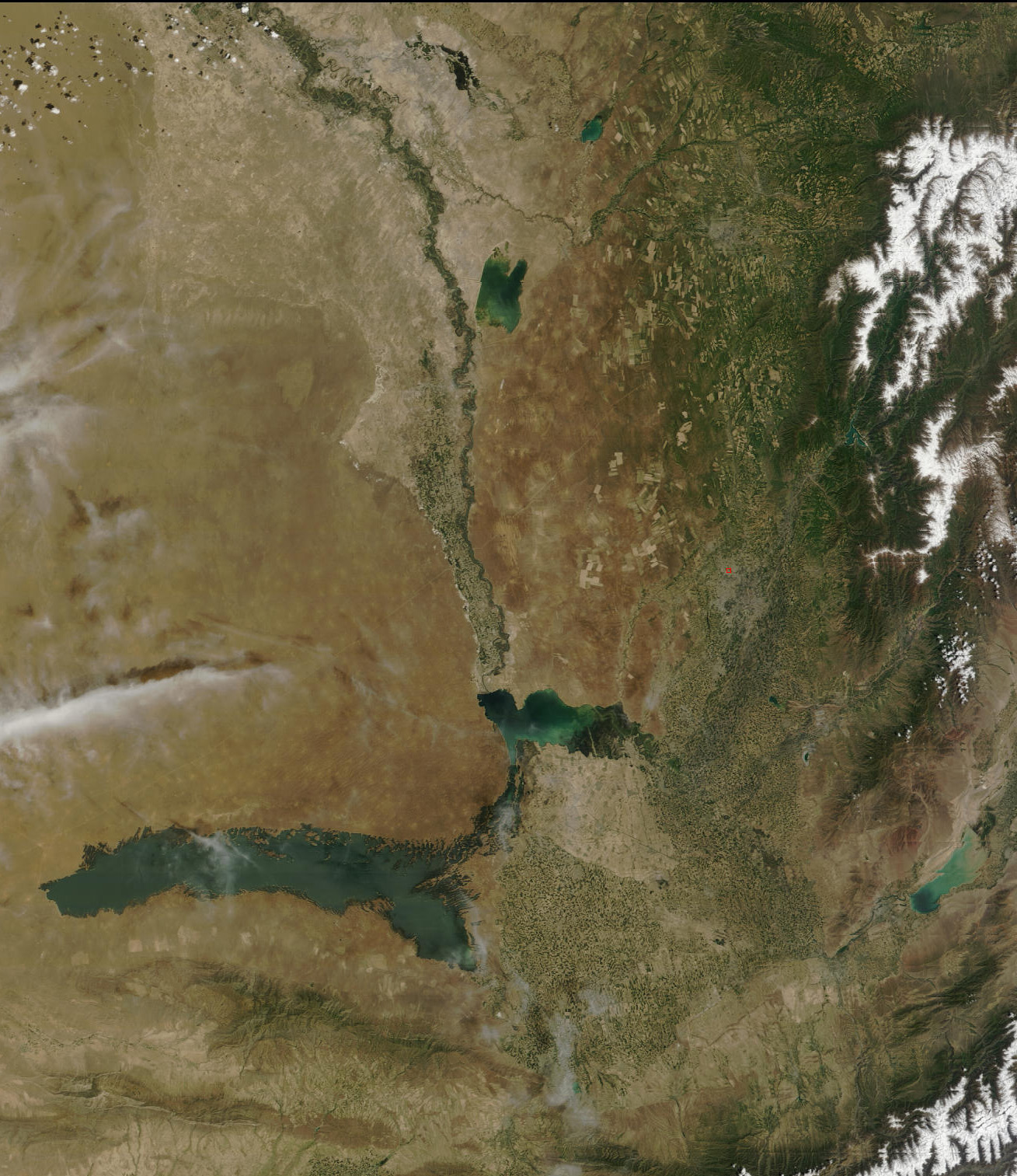
- Chardara Reservoir (center)

- Location within Kazakhstan
- Country: Kazakhstan
- Location: Shardara District
- Coordinates: 41°14′43.14″N 67°57′37.94″E
- Purpose: Irrigation, power
- Status: Operational
- Construction began: 1964
- Opening date: 1968

Dam and spillways
- Type of dam: Embankment, earth-fill
- Impounds: Syr Darya River
- Height: 28.5 m (94 ft)
- Length: 5,300 m (17,400 ft)
- Spillway type: Gate-controlled

Reservoir
- Creates: Shardara Reservoir
- Total capacity: 5,700,000,000 m^{3} (4,600,000 acre⋅ft)
- Active capacity: 4,700,000,000 m^{3} (3,800,000 acre⋅ft)
- Surface area: 900 km^{2} (350 mi^{2})
- Maximum length: 80 km (50 mi)
- Maximum width: 15 km (9.3 mi) (average)
- Maximum water depth: 6.3 m (21 ft) (average)

Shardara Hydroelectric Power Station
- Commission date: 1968
- Turbines: 4 x 25 MW Kaplan-type
- Installed capacity: 100 MW

The Shardara Dam (Kazakh: Shardara), also known as Chardara Dam, is an earth-fill embankment dam on the Syr Darya River in Shardara District, Kazakhstan. The dam has an associated 100 MW hydroelectric plant named Shardara Hydroelectric Power Station.

== History ==
The dam was constructed between 1964 and 1968 at the time of the Kazakh SSR. Its primary purpose was irrigation. The dam has been undergoing structural rehabilitation and a power station upgrade is currently in planning. The power station's four 25 MW Kaplan turbine-generators are scheduled to be upgraded to 31.5 MW each.

== Reservoir ==
The reservoir created by the dam has a maximum storage capacity of 5,700,000,000 m^{3} (4,600,000 acre⋅ft) and a surface area of 900 km^{2} (350 mi^{2}). It provides water to the Kyzyl-Kum channel for crop irrigation.

== See also ==
- Farkhad Dam – upstream
- List of reservoirs by surface area
