= Saral Lake =

Lake in Azad Kashmir, Pakistan

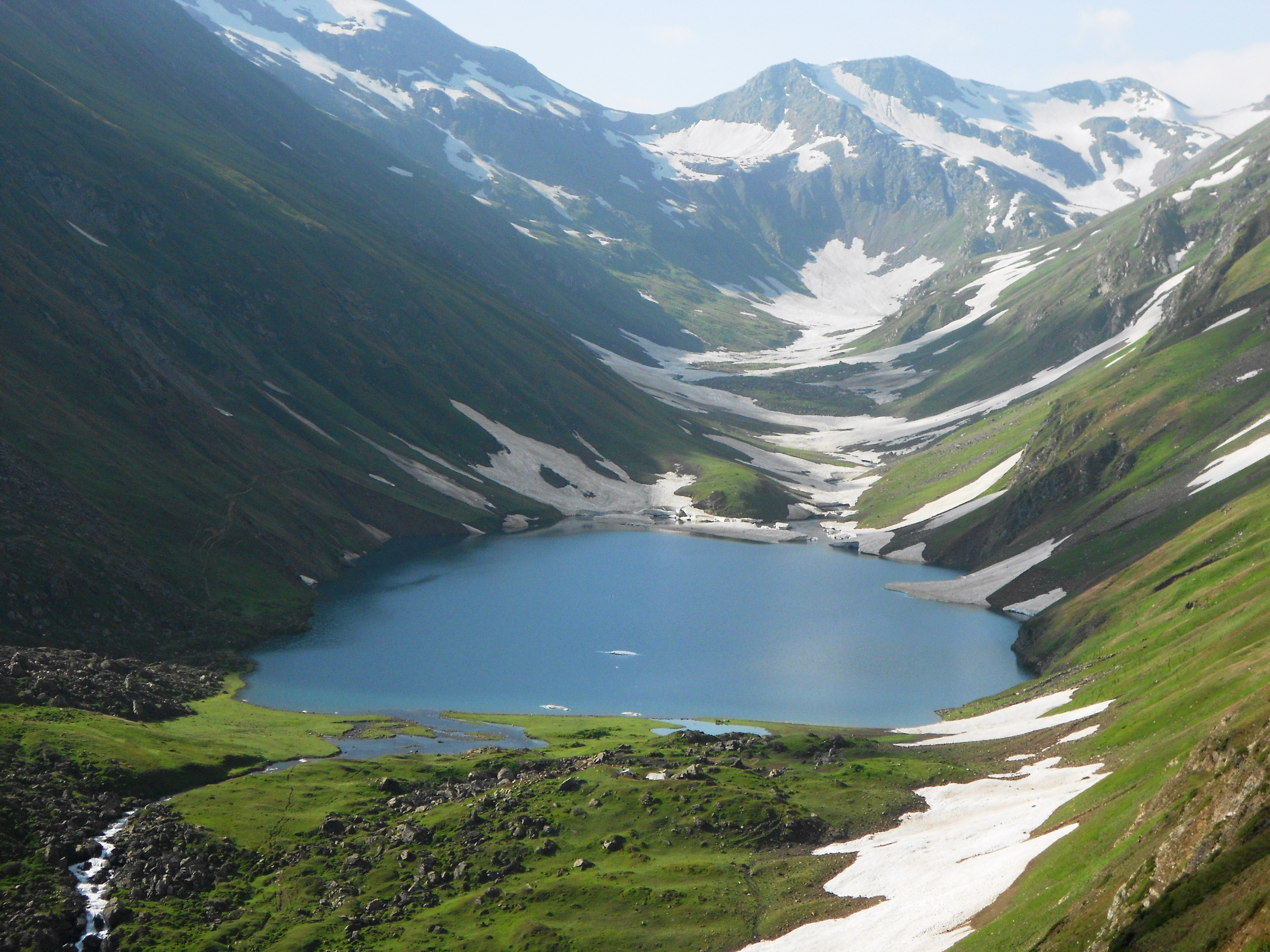
- An aerial view of lake

- Location within Azad Kashmir
- Location: Neelam Valley, Azad Kashmir
- Coordinates: 34.9637°N 74.0998°E
- Type: Glacial lake
- Primary inflows: Glacier waters
- Basin countries: Pakistan
- Surface elevation: 4,100 metres (13,600 ft)

Saral Lake is on border of Neelam, Azad Kashmir and the Kaghan Valley in Pakistan at an altitude of 4,100 metres (13,600 ft). The lake is accessible from Sharda by a track though Gumot National Park.

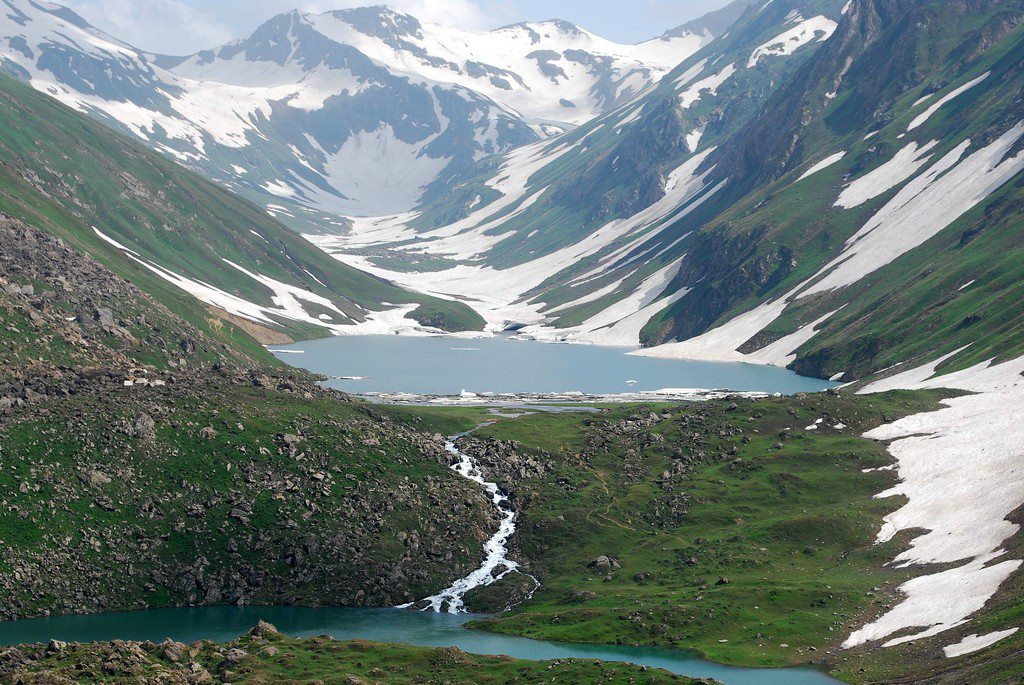
Saral Lake

== See also ==
- Chitta Katha Lake
- Ratti Gali Lake
- List of lakes of Pakistan
