= Schultz Lake =

Schultz Lake may refer to:

- Schultz Lake (Meeker County, Minnesota)
- Schultz Lake (St. Louis County, Minnesota)
- Schultz Lake (Arkansas), a lake in Cleveland County, Arkansas
