= Schultz Lake (St. Louis County, Minnesota) =

Lake in the state of Minnesota, United States

- Location within Minnesota
- Location: St. Louis County, Minnesota
- Coordinates: 46°59′36″N 92°7′56″W
- Type: lake

Schultz Lake is a lake in St. Louis County, in the U.S. state of Minnesota.

Schultz Lake bears the name of an early settler.

== See also ==
- List of lakes in Minnesota
