= Schultz Lake (Meeker County, Minnesota) =

Lake in the state of Minnesota, United States

- Location within Minnesota
- Location: Meeker County, Minnesota
- Coordinates: 45°9′47″N 94°31′52″W
- Type: lake

Schultz Lake is a lake in Meeker County, in the U.S. state of Minnesota.

== History ==
Schultz Lake was named for the Schultz brothers, local German settlers.

== See also ==
- List of lakes in Minnesota
