= Trego, Montana =

- Census-designated place
- Location within Montana Location within the United States
- Coordinates: 48°39′20″N 114°55′20″W
- Country: United States
- State: Montana
- County: Lincoln

Area
  - Total: 54.83 sq mi (142.01 km^{2})
  - Land: 53.90 sq mi (139.61 km^{2})
  - Water: 0.93 sq mi (2.40 km^{2})
- Elevation: 3,445 ft (1,050 m)

Population (2020)
  - Total: 515
  - Density: 9.6/sq mi (3.69/km^{2})
- Time zone: UTC-7 (Mountain (MST))
  - Summer (DST): UTC-6 (MDT)
- ZIP code: 59934
- Area code: 406
- GNIS feature ID: 2583859
- FIPS code: 30-74725

Trego is an unincorporated community, and census-designated place (CDP), in Lincoln County, Montana, United States. As of the 2020 US Census, Trego has a population of 515. Trego is located 1.5 miles west of US Highway 93 and serves as the gateway community to the Tobacco Valley when traveling from Flathead County heading north.

== Geography ==
Trego is in northeastern Lincoln County and occupies a large portion of the valley of Fortine Creek and surrounding countryside. U.S. Route 93 runs along the northeast edge of the CDP, approximately 2.5 miles (4.0 km) northeast of the original railroad-station community of Trego, while the CDP extends southwest from the rail station up Fortine Creek for 10 miles (16 km). US 93 leads northwest 16 miles (26 km) to Eureka and southeast 35 miles (56 km) to Whitefish.

Trego is located about 25 miles south of the Roosville Border Crossing with British Columbia, Canada, 16 miles south of Eureka, Montana, 5 miles south of Fortine, Montana, and 7 miles north of Stryker, Montana.

According to the U.S. Census Bureau, the Trego CDP has a total area of 52.1 square miles (135.0 km^{2}), of which 51.2 square miles (132.6 km^{2}) are land and 0.9 square miles (2.4 km^{2}), or 1.78%, are water.

The Trego area is characterized by dense coniferous forests, open meadowlands, and abundance of small creeks and lakes. The landscape is dominated by the Whitefish Range, which lies just east of Highway 93, punctuated by Stryker Peak and Mount Marston.

Dickey Lake is the largest lake in Trego, followed by Murphy Lake, both of which offer recreational activities including boat ramps, campgrounds, hiking trails, and swimming beaches. Fortine Creek, the largest in Trego, offers recreation opportunities with public access.

== Climate ==
The climate in Trego, MT is generally mild and temperate, with cold winters and warm summers. Temperatures range from an average high of 85 degrees Fahrenheit in the summer to an average low of 12 degrees Fahrenheit in the winter. During the spring and fall months, temperatures can range between 35 and 70 degrees Fahrenheit. Precipitation levels are fairly consistent throughout the year, with most months receiving around 2-3 inches of rain per month. Snowfall can range from a few inches to several feet, depending on the season. Overall, Trego experiences a pleasant climate year round that is ideal for outdoor activities like hiking and camping.

Trego, Montana gets 17 inches of rain, on average, per year. The US average is 38 inches of rain per year.

Trego averages 56 inches of snow per year. The US average is 28 inches of snow per year.

== History ==
The Fortin Family

The Fortin's are the most notable family in Trego's history, being the first homesteaders to the region. In 1894, Octave Fortin and his family settled on 160 acres of meadowland just east of where "Trego" would eventually stand. This homestead would eventually become to be known as the OF Ranch (what today is known as Blarney Ranch). Octave's brother, Phillip Fortin, also homesteaded in the region, about four miles north of Octave's claim (what today is known as the Dunlap Hay Ranch).

The Fort Steele/Kalispell Trail bordered the Fortin Ranch along the eastern boundary, and remnants of this original Native American/horse/wagon trail are still visible on the ranch, as are the remnants of the original buildings the Fortin's constructed. Today, much of the trail was filled over and paved for modern day "Ant Flat Road."

Octave Fortin, and wife Lena, had five sons, Edward and Walter Ritter (Lena's sons from a previous marriage where their father, William Ritter, died), as well as Oscar, Philip, and Henry. The family primarily raised cattle on the ranch, but also produced other goods such as butter, milk, hay and grains.

Fortin to Fortine

The town of Fortine, Fortine Creek, and Fortine Creek Road are named in honor of the Fortin Family, however there is discussion on how the "E" became affixed to the name Fortin, and has remained to this day. As told directly by Henry Fortin in his memoir, "The OF Ranch," he states, 'the true version of it was when some of the (Great Northern) railroad engineers asked Father (Octave) how he pronounced his name. He naturally pronounced it the French way, For - Tan. Since it was very difficult for Father to write, and even more difficult for him to spell his name, they asked him if it wasn't spelled Fortine. Being a little embarrassed and not wishing to discuss it further, Father replied, 'Oui Oui,' meaning, 'Yes Yes' in English, and so the name Fortine came into existence.'

The Great Northern Railway "Town Swap"

When the Great Northern Railway came through this region in the early 1900s, and was completed in 1904, many of the rail stops and sidings were named, two of which were Trego and Fortine. There are many local rumors about how Trego should be Fortine and Fortine should be Trego, meaning the town names were swapped. This is attributed to an error by the Great Northern Railway. The error was acknowledged in an August 6, 1904 article of the Tobacco Plains Journal (now the Tobacco Valley News), stating, 'Harrisburg will disappear and Fortine will take its place, and Fortine is down as Trego.' The confusion arises from an unnamed railroad engineer who mounted the sign "Trego" on what was supposed to be the Fortine station/siding, and mounted the "Fortine" sign on what was supposed to be the Trego station/siding. Once the mistake had been realized, the Great Northern Railway had already printed all of their maps, publications, and informational flyers detailing their new rail line from Kalispell/Whitefish to Eureka, so instead of re-printing everything and the great expense involved, they opted to just leave the names, which has remained to this day.

The Fortin Family Legacy on the Region

In 1905, Octave Fortin was one of the three founding members of Trego School District #53, which is still operating as a K-8 public school for the families of Trego.

On May 13, 1925, Octave was issued the first ever US Forest Service Grazing Permit for the Blackfeet National Forest, now known as the Kootenai National Forest, creating a legacy for area ranches that still is active to this day in Lincoln County, with 13 currently active US Forest Service grazing permit allotments for cattle.

The town of Fortine, Fortine Creek, and Fortine Creek Road are all named in honor of Octave and his family. Also, what is now known as Marl Lake, just west of Fortine, was originally named Fortine Lake.

Ant Flat Ranger Station

Little was known about Montana’s vast, unmapped wilderness when presidential proclamations set aside U.S. forest reserves during the 1890s. In 1904, this site became one of the region’s first year-round ranger stations. Ample water, land suitable for pasture and domestic gardens, proximity to heavy timberlands, and access to the Great Northern Railway made Ant Flat an ideal location.

President Theodore Roosevelt appointed his friend Fred Herrig, a decorated Rough Rider, its first ranger. The primitive facility grew and by the end of Herrig’s tenure in 1920, this strategically positioned district within the Blackfeet Forest Reserve was top-rated for fire detection, prevention, and control. Although no original log buildings remain at Ant Flat, lilac bushes Herrig planted mark the site of the first primitive headquarters.

The remaining buildings of the historic complex date to post 1920 when the Forest Service began to serve a wider traveling public. As use of national forests increased, the appearance of official facilities became more important and the Forest Service sought to harmonize its buildings with the environment. Ant Flat Station reflects these trends. The six-stall log barn (1921-1925) recalls the earlier construction phases and the importance of pack animals. The less “rustic” Craftsman style office/warehouse (1927), gas and oil storage building (1932), and garage and mechanic shop (1934) are a more formal expression of the Forest Service ethic. Ant Flat became a seasonal work center in 1963 but its presence chronicles the evolution of the Forest Service from its beginning through the formative 1920s and 1930s.

Trego Community Hall

The Trego Community Hall, now known as the Trego, Fortine, Stryker (TFS) Community Hall was established in 1947 by a group of volunteers on land donated by the Opelt Family.

The Community Hall features tall ceilings, which were designed so it could host basketball games and the stage was built so music could be shared for dances and parties. During later years of expansion, a kitchen and front hallway were added, as well as running water and additional lighting, to allow the hall to continue to be a modern gathering place for the Trego community and the neighboring communities of Fortine and Stryker.

The Community Hall hosts annual events such as the Easter Egg Hunt, the Bike-a-Thon, Trego Heritage Days, a Halloween Party, and the Trego Christmas Bazaar.

Dickey Lake Bible Camp

In 1946, Pastors Arvid Erickson, Harold Erickson, Johnny Tieszen, Everett Hansen and local families from Trego, Fortine, Evergreen, and Ronan, Montana, joined with missionaries Ms. Anna Sontra and Ms. Belle Thompson of the CM&A working with the Flathead Indian Reservation, the local Ross McKenzie family, The Bible Club Ministry in Kalispell and other ministry minded families, to create a camp where they would minister to youth and adults. The setting was a parcel of land on the northwest shores of Dickey Lake in Trego, Montana, which is still in operation to this day.

== Arts and Culture ==
Each year, Trego plays host to several local events which celebrate the unique history and culture of the region, including the Backwoods Accordion Festival and the Trego Car Show held annually in July, as well as Trego Heritage Days, held annually in September.

Trego currently has two locations listed on the National Register of Historic Places, the Ant Flat Ranger Station, which was officially designated in 1996. Ant Flat Ranger Station is open to the public year-round and is located halfway between Fortine Creek Road and Highway 93 on Ant Flat Road. The second, and most recent designation, is the Fortin Ranch House, designated in March 2025, on the aforementioned historic Fortin Ranch.

Also at the Ant Flat Ranger Station is Ant Flat Nature Trail #348, which leads to a viewing platform allowing visitors to see a marshland ecosystem. This is a loop trail that is designed for wheelchair access to the platform, then foot travel for the remainder of the 1-mile, self-guided nature trail. Restrooms and picnicking areas are provided.

== Government Services ==
Trego has a United States Post Office, as well as the Trego, Fortine, Stryker Volunteer Fire Department, both of which are located adjacent to each other on Fortine Creek Road.

== Education ==
Trego School District #53 offers K-8 education for local children.
