= Sylvanite, Montana =

- Census-designated place
- Location within Montana Location within the United States
- Coordinates: 48°44′20″N 115°53′05″W
- Country: United States
- State: Montana
- County: Lincoln

Area
  - Total: 5.71 sq mi (14.80 km^{2})
  - Land: 5.71 sq mi (14.80 km^{2})
  - Water: 0 sq mi (0.00 km^{2})
- Elevation: 2,690 ft (820 m)

Population (2020)
  - Total: 98
  - Density: 17.1/sq mi (6.62/km^{2})
- Time zone: UTC-7 (Mountain (MST))
  - Summer (DST): UTC-6 (MDT)
- Area code: 406
- FIPS code: 30-73165
- GNIS feature ID: 2583857

Sylvanite is a census-designated place (CDP) in Lincoln County, Montana, United States. As of the 2020 census, Sylvanite had a population of 98.

The community is in Kootenai National Forest in northwestern Lincoln County, in the valley of the Yaak River, a south-flowing tributary of the Kootenai River. Yaak River Road (National Forest Road 92) runs through the valley, leading south 11 miles (18 km) to U.S. Route 2 in the Kootenai valley and northeast (upriver) 17 miles (27 km) to Yaak.

According to the U.S. Census Bureau, the Sylvanite CDP has an area of 5.7 square miles (14.8 km^{2}), all land.

== Demographics ==
Historical population
Census	Pop.	Note	%±
2020	98		—
U.S. Decennial Census
