= Weasel Fire =

2017 wildfire in Montana, United States

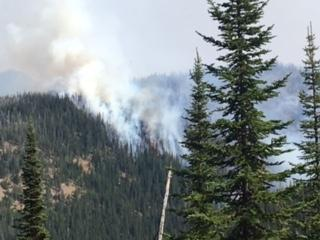
- Weasel Fire on September 13, 2017
- Date: September 2, 2017 – November 2, 2017
- Location: Kootenai National Forest, Montana, United States
- Coordinates: 48.954°N 114.73°W

Statistics
- Burned area: 3,925 acres (16 km^{2})

Ignition
- Cause: Lightning

Map
- Location of fire in Montana.

The Weasel Fire was a wildfire 17 miles northeast of Eureka in the Kootenai National Forest in Montana in the United States. The fire was started by a lightning strike and first reported on September 2, 2017. The fire burned a total of 3,925 acres (16 km^{2}) and was one of three fires, alongside the Gibralter Fire and Caribou Fire, burning in the vicinity at the same time.

July 30, 2022, another fire was also named the Weasel Fire. According to the Montana DNRC website the location is 48.976646977409395, -114.7491624746314, about 15 miles northeast of Eureka in the Kootenai National Forest in Montana in the United States.

== Events ==
2017 - The Weasel Fire resulted from a lightning strike in the Kootenai National Forest, 17 miles northeast of Eureka. The fire was first reported on September 2, 2017, at 1:46 PM. The fire was fueled by litter and understory timber, comprising subalpine fir, burning in steep, inaccessible terrain. Due to the fire's inaccessibility, fire crews were not able to view the fire for evaluation until September 11. The fire was estimated to have burned 869 acres (4 km^{2}). By September 13, the fire had spread to Weasel Lake, resulting in Weasel Cabin and its accompanying dock to be wrapped for protection purposes. The Weasel Fire began burning on Tuchuck Mountain and grew to 3,925 acres (16 km^{2}). Restoration and cleanup began and on September 22 Weasel Lake was open again to the public. The fire was reported out and contained on November 2, 2017.

2022 - The Weasel Fire was discovered on July 30, 2022, was started by lightning.
