= West Kootenai, Montana =

- Census-designated place
- Location within Montana Location within the United States
- Coordinates: 48°58′20″N 115°14′21″W
- Country: United States
- State: Montana
- County: Lincoln

Area
  - Total: 16.14 sq mi (41.79 km^{2})
  - Land: 16.07 sq mi (41.63 km^{2})
  - Water: 0.062 sq mi (0.16 km^{2})
- Elevation: 2,740 ft (840 m)

Population (2020)
  - Total: 422
  - Density: 26.3/sq mi (10.14/km^{2})
- Time zone: UTC-7 (Mountain (MST))
  - Summer (DST): UTC-6 (MDT)
- Area code: 406
- FIPS code: 30-79105
- GNIS feature ID: 2583864

West Kootenai is a census-designated place (CDP) in Lincoln County, Montana, United States. As of the 2020 census, West Kootenai had a population of 422.

== Boarding School ==
The West Kootenai was the location for an all-boys boarding school due to its remote location. It is now closed.

== Geography ==
West Kootenai is in northern Lincoln County, Montana on the west side of Lake Koocanusa, a large reservoir on the Kootenai River. The community is within the Kootenai National Forest. The northern boundary of the CDP is the Canada–United States border, with the Regional District of East Kootenay, British Columbia, to the north. There is no border crossing through West Kootenai; road access is from the south via West Kootenai Road. The city of Eureka, Montana, 11 miles (18 km) to the southeast as the crow flies, is 30 miles (48 km) distant by road.

According to the U.S. Census Bureau, the West Kootenai CDP has a total area of 16.1 square miles (41.8 km^{2}), of which 16.1 square miles (41.6 km^{2}) are land and 0.1 square miles (0.2 km^{2}), or 0.46%, are water.

== Demographics ==
Historical population
Census	Pop.	Note	%±
2020	422		—
U.S. Decennial Census

== Lakes ==
There are a few named lakes in the West Kootenai. Along West Kootenai Road is Tooley Lake and further down is Alkali Lake accessed via dirt road.

== See also ==
- Caribou Fire
