= Caribou Fire =

2017 wildfire in Montana, United States

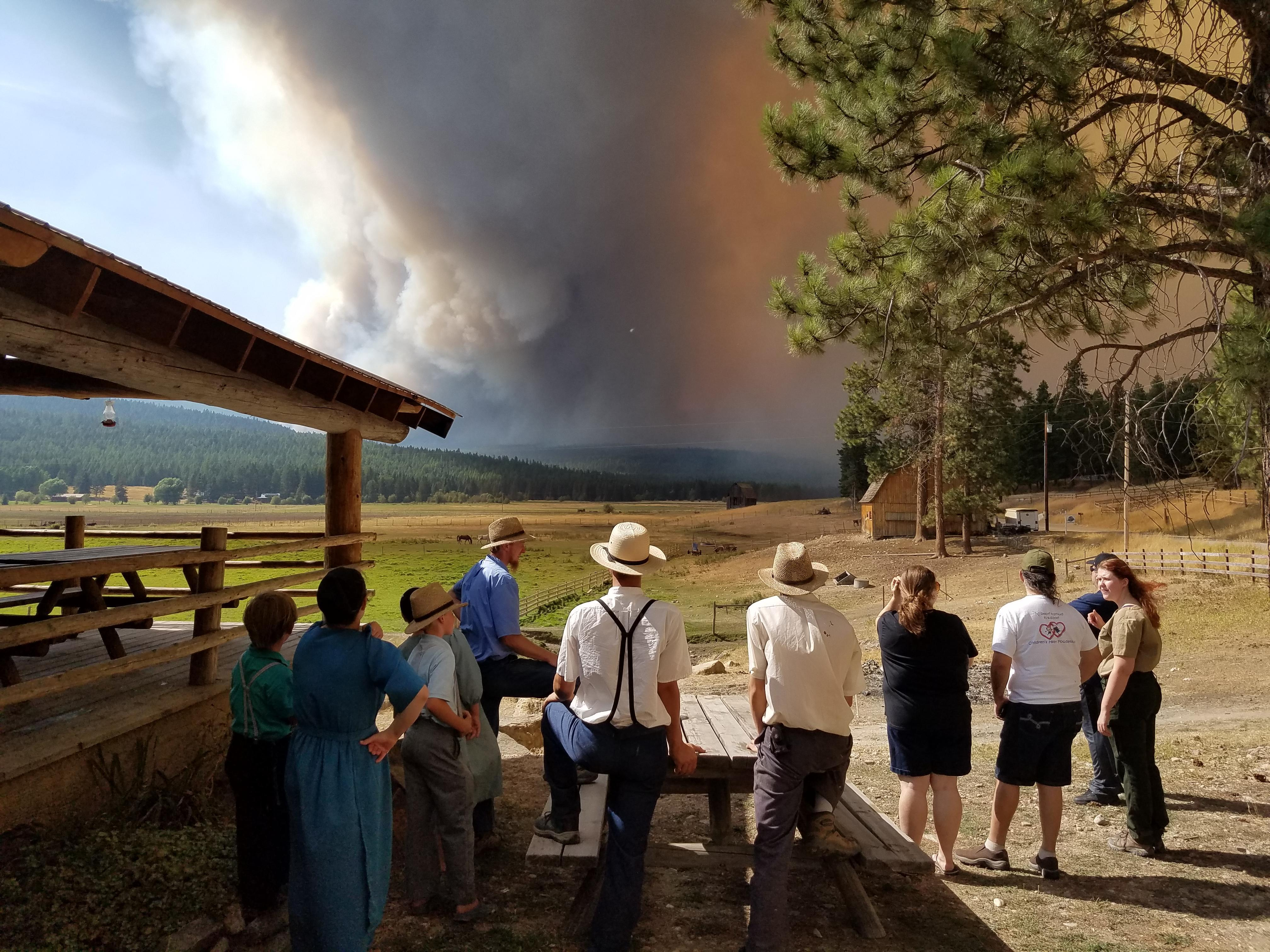
- Caribou Fire as seen from West Kootenai on September 2, 2017
- Date: August 11, 2017 – November 2, 2017
- Location: Kootenai National Forest, Montana, United States
- Coordinates: 48.973°N 115.441°W

Statistics
- Burned area: 24,753 acres (100 km^{2})

Impacts
- Injuries: 1
- Structures destroyed: 40

Ignition
- Cause: Lightning

Map
- Location of fire in Montana.

The Caribou Fire (also known as the Linklater Fire) was a wildfire in the Kootenai National Forest, 21 miles northwest of Eureka, Montana in the United States. The fire, which was first reported on August 11, 2017, was started by a lightning strike and burned a total of 24,753 acres (100 km^{2}), including 2,761 acres (11 km^{2}) acres in Canada. The fire threatened the community of West Kootenai, Montana, resulting in a mandatory evacuation of the community. It destroyed 10 homes. The Caribou Fire was one three fires burning in the forest, alongside the Gibralter Fire and Weasel Fire.

== Events ==
=== August ===
The Caribou Fire was reported on August 11, 2017, at 10:51 AM, 21 miles northwest of Eureka in the Yaak Area of Kootenai National Forest. It was started by a lightning strike in the upper reaches of Caribou Creek and Robinson Mountain. It was fueled by subalpine fir timber and dead and downed spruce. Crews estimated the fire had burned 520 acres (2 km^{2}) by August 24, leading fire crews to begin mopping and patrolling for flare ups. The fire resulted in the forest instituting a Stage II Fire Restriction prohibiting fire, campfire and stove fire use of any kind except for those from liquid petroleum or propane. The fire's expansion towards the Canadian border launched coordination between Canadian officials and an aircraft was used to drop fire retardant. As the fire expanded 1,257 acres (5 km^{2}), crews worked to keep the fire south of the Canadian border using air and ground resources to create fire lines.

By August 28, the fire had expanded .25 miles into Canada, with 90% remaining in the U.S. Canadian fire managers launched contingency lines. The Caribou Fire continued to grow northeast, with fire lines passing into the Young J Fire area that burned in 2000. Canadian authorities named the fire burning in Canada the Linklater Fire. Basin Yaak Rd. to Dodge Summit and Caribou Creek Campground were closed.

=== September ===
By September 1, the Caribou Fire had grown to 4,818 acres (19 km^{2}). The next day, the fire moved east towards Forest Road 303, threatening 400 structures and prompting mandatory orders for West Kootenai, Montana. Overnight, the fire doubled in size to 6,785 acres (27 km^{2}), expanding four miles northeast, destroying a number of structures. On September 5, property owners who suffered damage or destruction of structures were escorted by the Lincoln County Sheriffs' Department to assess their properties. Protection measures were put in place in the Basin Creek area and pre-evacuation orders were put in place for the West Kootenai area south of Tooley Lake and Basin Creek. Upon further inspection, 10 homes and 30 outbuildings were destroyed in the West Kootenai. Crews used heavy equipment to improve fire lines around West Kootenai and firefighters patrolled homes at night from spot fires.

By September 7, the Caribou Fire was 20,631 acres (83 km^{2}) and was 27% contained, with 18,317 acres (74 km^{2}) in the U.S. and 2,314 acres (9 km^{2}) burned. Evacuation orders were lifted on September 10. Canadian scooper planes brought water to help slow fire growth, dropping 140,800 gallons of water in one day. One firefighter was injured on September 15, sustaining injuries from a snag on their left shoulder and neck. They were released the same day after evaluation at a hospital.

== October and November ==
Restoration and rehabilitation began in late fall, including the felling of hazard trees along roads and the fire perimeter. Over 200 miles of roads were rebuilt or repaired. The fire was declared 100% contained on November 2, 2017. It burned a total of 24,753 acres (100 km^{2}).

== See also ==
- Gibralter Fire
- Weasel Fire
