= Orophe cabinetus =

Scientific classification
- Kingdom: Animalia
- Phylum: Arthropoda
- Subphylum: Myriapoda
- Class: Diplopoda
- Order: Polydesmida
- Family: Xystodesmidae
- Genus: Orophe
- Species: O. cabinetus

Binomial name
- Orophe cabinetus Chamberlin, 1951

Species of millipede

Orophe cabinetus is a species of millipede in the family Xystodesmidae, which is found in the Rocky Mountains of western Montana. It is the type species of the genus Orophe and was described in 1951 by Ralph V. Chamberlin.

== Description ==
Orophe cabinetus is a robust Xystodesmid millipede that superficially looks identical to its sister species, Orophe unicus. The two species are only differentiated by a slight difference in the structure of gonopod and by the range, with O. cabinetus occurring in Montana, while O. unicus occurs in Idaho. The segments are brown to black in background color with a lighter yellow to orange spot on the caudal portion of the metatergite and matching color of the paranota. The paranota of the first few segments are broad and nearly contacting the adjacent segment, but the paranota of the later segments become more narrow and widely separated. The paranota also arise low on the segments and are noticeably depressed, giving the millipede a domed appearance.

== Range ==
The species has been described from Mineral, Sanders, and Lake counties in western Montana and additional observations on INaturalist have also found them in Flathead county.

== Etymology ==
The species name is a reference to the Cabinet National Forest where the species was originally found. The Cabinet National Forest was divided among Kaniksu, Kootenai and Lolo National Forests.
