= Midvale, Montana =

- Former CDP
- Location within Montana Location within the United States
- Coordinates: 48°53′25″N 115°03′16″W
- Country: United States
- State: Montana
- County: Lincoln

Area
  - Total: 0.42 sq mi (1.08 km^{2})
  - Land: 0.42 sq mi (1.08 km^{2})
  - Water: 0 sq mi (0.00 km^{2})
- Elevation: 2,599 ft (792 m)

Population (2010)
  - Total: 393
  - Density: 942/sq mi (364/km^{2})
- Time zone: UTC-7 (Mountain (MST))
  - Summer (DST): UTC-6 (MDT)
- Area code: 406
- GNIS feature ID: 2583830

Midvale is a former census-designated place (CDP) in Lincoln County, Montana, United States. The population was 393 at the 2010 census. The area was on the north side of the town of Eureka, but was annexed by the town after 2010.
