= Tooley Lake =

Lake in Lincoln County, Montana, United States of America

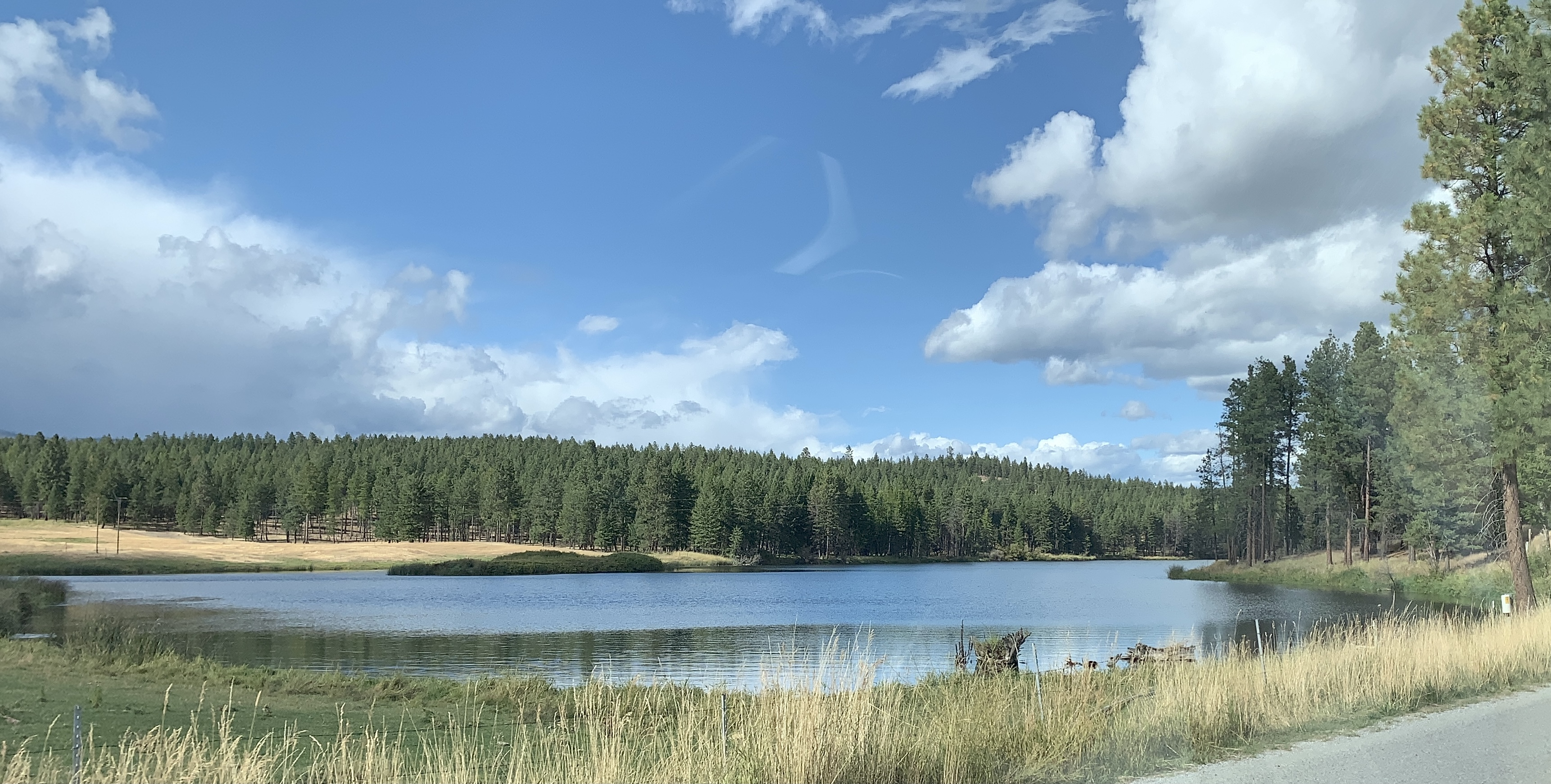
- Tooley Lake seen from the southeast.

- Location within Montana Location within the United States
- Location: Lincoln County
- Coordinates: 48.9533°N 115.2013°W
- Type: lake
- Surface area: 28.6 acres (0.116 km^{2})
- Surface elevation: 2,543 feet (775 m)
- Islands: 1

Tooley Lake is a lake in Lincoln County, Montana at an elevation of 2,543 feet (775 m). It is located in the West Kootenai.

== Geographical Features ==
There is a small unnamed island located in the south part of the lake.
