= Gibralter Fire =

2017 wildfire in Montana, United States

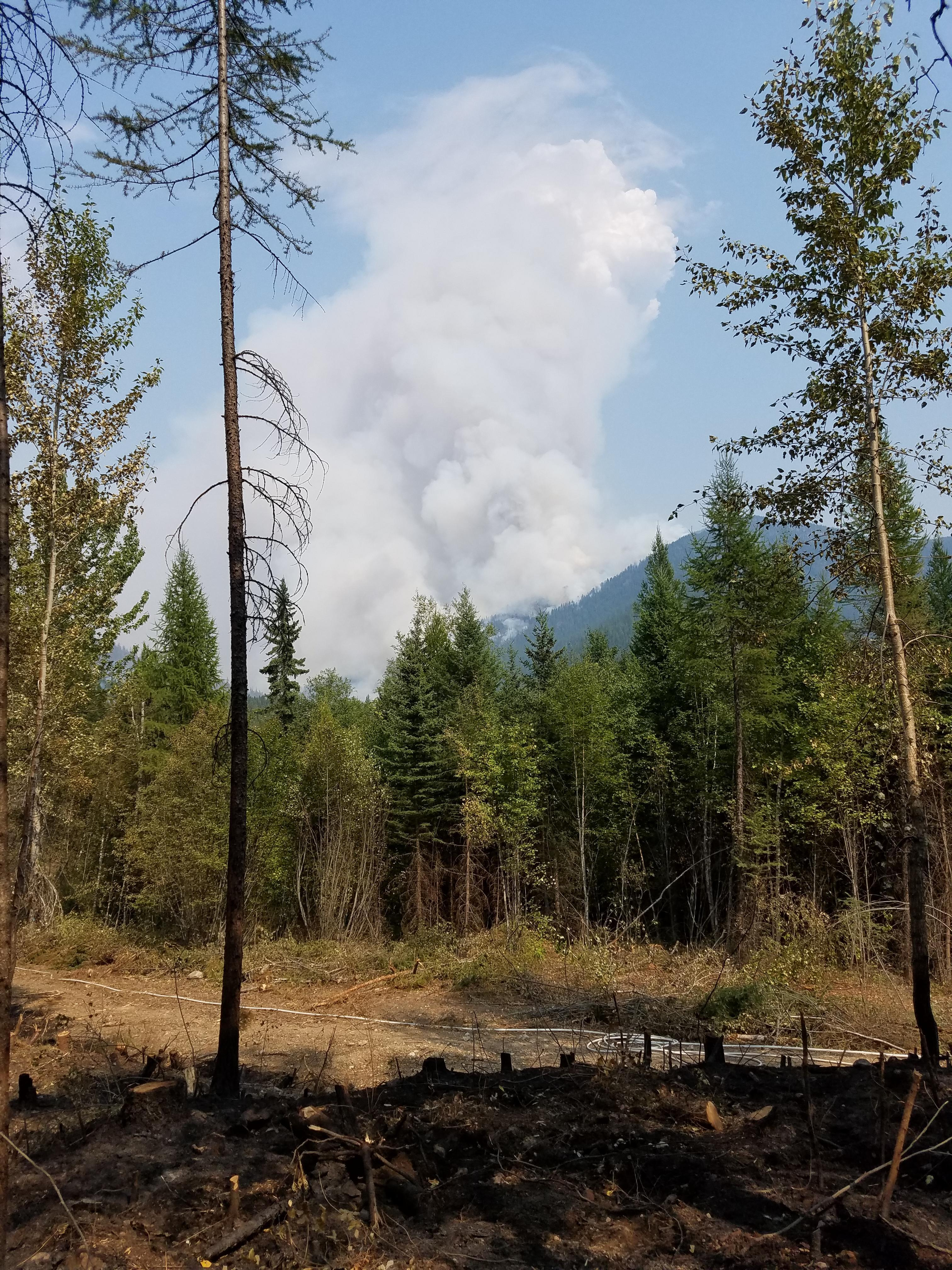
- Gibralter Fire in August 27, 2017
- Date: August 7, 2017 – November 13, 2017
- Location: Kootenai National Forest, Montana, United States
- Coordinates: 48.857°N 114.857°W

Statistics
- Burned area: 12,938 acres (52 km^{2})

Ignition
- Cause: Lightning

Map
- Location of fire in Montana.

The Gibralter Fire (also called the Gibralter Ridge Fire) was a wildfire in Kootenai National Forest, 7 miles (11 km) east of Eureka, Montana in the United States. The fire, which was started by a lightning strike, was reported on August 7, 2017, and burned a total of 12,938 acres (52 km^{2}). The fire threatened numerous private property and structures, as well as recreational and historical sites in the forest.

== Events ==
=== August ===
The Gibralter Fire was started by lightning and was first reported on August 7, 2017, at 9:06 PM in the Kootenai National Forest, seven miles east of Eureka. Burning in steep, inaccessible terrain and fueled by grass and understory timber, the Gibralter Fire caused immediate evacuations of residents in four areas of the forest and closed over 20 forest service roads east and north of U.S. Route 93 and numerous other areas of the forest, including Grave Creek Camp Ground, Bunchgrass Camp Ground, Clarence Creek Guard Station, Birch Creek Recreation Area, Big and Little Therriault Camp Ground, Horse Camp, Stahl Peak Lookout, Mount Wam Lookout and Wolverine Cabin. Temporary re-entry was allowed for residents over the course of the week. Red flag warning were declared on August 12. Evacuation orders were lifted on August 14, however evacuation warnings and specific closures remained in place. By August 20, the Gibralter Fire had grown to 3,253 acres (13 km^{2}) and was 13% contained with 425 fire personnel fighting the fire. Progress was made on firebreaks, with 15 miles (24 km) of breaks being built along Foothills and Grave Creek Roads. A helicopter helped with fire control and mop up continued.

On August 24, the fire made a "major run" according to the U.S. Forest Service, heading north and east by strong winds. It grew 1,500 acres (6 km^{2}) towards Mount Scotty, marking 5,000 acres (20 km^{2}) in total land burned. To combat the fire's growth, crews implemented group and individual tree torching and cleaned up brush to improve fuel breaks. Helicopters continued to drop water to stop spot fires and water pumps were installed to protect historic bridges in the area. The number of personnel fighting the fire was cut back, due to resources, to 87 on August 27.

=== September ===
By September 1, the Gibralter Fire had grown to 6,588 acres (27 km^{2}) and was 27% contained, with 38 fire personnel fighting the fire. Rain helped moderate fire activity and mop up continued. The fire was slowed by helicopter water drops and Wam Lookout was wrapped for fire protection and additional fire protections being implemented for private homes along Grave Creek. By September 12, the fire remained burning in Williams Creek and had moved over Locke Mountain and into Flathead National Forest. The fire had grown to 8,932 acres (36 km^{2}). The next day, crews wrapped Ninko cabin to provide structure protection. After six weeks of fighting the fire, it had grown to 12,938 acres (52 km^{2}) in total by containment on September 20. Containment was successful in part to cooler temperatures and soaking rains.

Rehabilitation proceeded after containment. Crews felled fire-damaged trees along roads and the fire perimeter. They repaired and rebuilt 34 miles (55 km) of roads. All trailheads impacted by the fire remain closed due to falling trees and debris.

== See also ==
- Caribou Fire
- Weasel Fire
