= Ant Flat Ranger Station =

- U.S. National Register of Historic Places
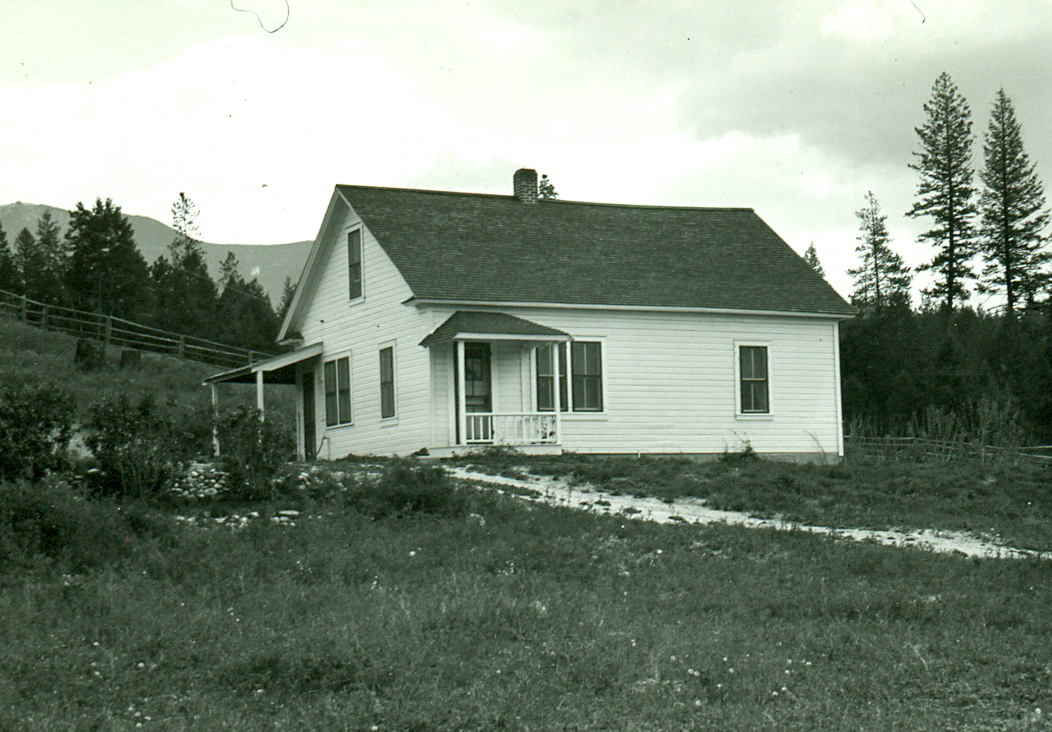
- USFS photo, 1935

- Location within Montana Location within the United States
- Location: United States Forest Service Road 36, 2 miles south of Fortine in the Kootenai National Forest
- Coordinates: 48°43′26″N 114°52′35″W
- Area: 3.1 acres (1.3 ha)
- Built: 1920, 1927, 1934, other
- Architectural style: Rustic log style
- NRHP reference No.: 94001021
- Added to NRHP: December 30, 1996

The Ant Flat Ranger Station is a site on the National Register of Historic Places located 2 miles south of Fortine, Montana in Kootenai National Forest. It was added to the Register on December 30, 1996.

It includes modern and historical buildings, with the latter in a cluster. It includes an office/warehouse building, Building #2216, a two-story wood-frame building constructed in 1927. It includes Building #2300, a warehouse built in 1934 as a garage and shop.
