= Yaak, Montana =

- Census-designated place
- Location within Montana Location within the United States
- Coordinates: 48°49′50″N 115°42′32″W
- Country: United States
- State: Montana
- County: Lincoln

Area
  - Total: 28.12 sq mi (72.83 km^{2})
  - Land: 27.85 sq mi (72.12 km^{2})
  - Water: 0.27 sq mi (0.71 km^{2})
- Elevation: 3,534 ft (1,077 m)

Population (2020)
  - Total: 338
  - Density: 12.1/sq mi (4.69/km^{2})
- Time zone: UTC-7 (Mountain (MST))
  - Summer (DST): UTC-6 (MDT)
- Area code: 406
- GNIS feature ID: 2583869
- FIPS code: 30-82130

Yaak is an unincorporated community and census-designated place in Lincoln County, Montana, United States. It is located along the Yaak River, within the Kootenai National Forest. As of the 2020 census, its population was 338.

Yaak has frequently been noted on lists of unusual place names.

Yaak derives its name from the Yaak River. According to local lore, A’ak is a Kootenai name meaning “Arrow.” The Kootenai River forms the shape of a drawn bow; its tributary the Yaak River is its arrow. Homesteaders arrived shortly after the passage of the Forest Homestead Act of 1906.

== History ==
Settlers wandered into the area from Canada in the 1860s, with the first homestead said to be in 1906.

== Climate ==
This climatic region is typified by large seasonal temperature differences, with warm to hot (and often humid) summers and cold (sometimes severely cold) winters. According to the Köppen Climate Classification system, Yaak has a humid continental climate, abbreviated "Dfb" on climate maps.

Climate data for Yaak, Montana, 1991–2020 normals, 1998-2020 extremes: 3085ft (940m)
| Month | Jan | Feb | Mar | Apr | May | Jun | Jul | Aug | Sep | Oct | Nov | Dec | Year |
|---|---|---|---|---|---|---|---|---|---|---|---|---|---|
| Record high °F (°C) | 50 (10) | 56 (13) | 72 (22) | 82 (28) | 89 (32) | 100 (38) | 100 (38) | 104 (40) | 93 (34) | 79 (26) | 61 (16) | 47 (8) | 104 (40) |
| Mean maximum °F (°C) | 42.7 (5.9) | 48.5 (9.2) | 59.9 (15.5) | 73.3 (22.9) | 83.0 (28.3) | 88.0 (31.1) | 94.6 (34.8) | 94.3 (34.6) | 86.2 (30.1) | 70.2 (21.2) | 51.7 (10.9) | 39.9 (4.4) | 96.3 (35.7) |
| Mean daily maximum °F (°C) | 29.3 (−1.5) | 35.8 (2.1) | 44.4 (6.9) | 54.4 (12.4) | 64.9 (18.3) | 71.1 (21.7) | 80.9 (27.2) | 81.1 (27.3) | 69.8 (21.0) | 52.6 (11.4) | 35.7 (2.1) | 26.5 (−3.1) | 53.9 (12.2) |
| Daily mean °F (°C) | 21.7 (−5.7) | 25.0 (−3.9) | 33.2 (0.7) | 40.7 (4.8) | 50.0 (10.0) | 56.0 (13.3) | 62.1 (16.7) | 61.6 (16.4) | 52.6 (11.4) | 40.2 (4.6) | 28.6 (−1.9) | 20.7 (−6.3) | 41.0 (5.0) |
| Mean daily minimum °F (°C) | 14.0 (−10.0) | 14.1 (−9.9) | 21.9 (−5.6) | 27.0 (−2.8) | 35.0 (1.7) | 40.9 (4.9) | 43.4 (6.3) | 42.0 (5.6) | 35.4 (1.9) | 27.8 (−2.3) | 21.5 (−5.8) | 14.8 (−9.6) | 28.2 (−2.1) |
| Mean minimum °F (°C) | −15.9 (−26.6) | −7.8 (−22.1) | 1.6 (−16.9) | 15.7 (−9.1) | 22.1 (−5.5) | 30.1 (−1.1) | 33.1 (0.6) | 30.7 (−0.7) | 23.9 (−4.5) | 10.6 (−11.9) | 2.3 (−16.5) | −12.2 (−24.6) | −24.2 (−31.2) |
| Record low °F (°C) | −41 (−41) | −29 (−34) | −30 (−34) | 4 (−16) | 18 (−8) | 25 (−4) | 30 (−1) | 27 (−3) | 19 (−7) | −11 (−24) | −18 (−28) | −27 (−33) | −41 (−41) |
| Average precipitation inches (mm) | 2.27 (58) | 1.73 (44) | 2.27 (58) | 1.23 (31) | 2.18 (55) | 2.54 (65) | 1.17 (30) | 0.93 (24) | 1.31 (33) | 1.70 (43) | 2.75 (70) | 2.69 (68) | 22.77 (579) |
| Average snowfall inches (cm) | 18.1 (46) | 13.9 (35) | 6.9 (18) | 1.7 (4.3) | 0.2 (0.51) | 0.0 (0.0) | 0.0 (0.0) | 0.0 (0.0) | 0.0 (0.0) | 0.9 (2.3) | 12.0 (30) | 20.1 (51) | 73.8 (187.11) |
| Average extreme snow depth inches (cm) | 21.1 (54) | 24.3 (62) | 22.4 (57) | 9.0 (23) | 0.0 (0.0) | 0.0 (0.0) | 0.0 (0.0) | 0.0 (0.0) | 0.0 (0.0) | 0.4 (1.0) | 6.5 (17) | 14.3 (36) | 26.7 (68) |
Source 1: NOAA
Source 2: XMACIS2 (records, monthly max/mins & 2003-2020 snow)

== Demographics ==
Historical population
| Census | Pop. | Note | %± |
|---|---|---|---|
| 2020 | 338 | | — |
U.S. Decennial Census
