= Eureka station =

Coordinates: 48.8764°N 115.0538°W

Eureka station was a station on the Great Northern Railway's Empire Builder in Eureka, Montana. It closed in 1970 when Lake Koocanusa was made, flooding The Kootenai River as well as Rexford, MT, where the lines used to run from Eureka to Libby. Around Stryker, the Flathead Tunnel was constructed to bypass Eureka and go to Libby.

== Today ==
The tracks are still in use in Eureka as part of the Mission Mountain Railroad. They operate as a branch line to Whitefish and the Flathead Tunnel but are mostly used to transport lumber and other goods to and from Eureka. The tracks that were in Old Rexford are still there, underwater in Lake Koocanusa.

== Notes ==
Preceding station	Great Northern Railway	Following station
Rexford toward Seattle	Main Line	Tobacco toward St. Paul
