= Indian Springs, Montana =

- Census-designated place
- Location within Montana Location within the United States
- Coordinates: 48°57′12″N 115°02′41″W
- Country: United States
- State: Montana
- County: Lincoln

Area
  - Total: 4.51 sq mi (11.68 km^{2})
  - Land: 4.50 sq mi (11.66 km^{2})
  - Water: 0.0077 sq mi (0.02 km^{2})
- Elevation: 2,832 ft (863 m)

Population (2020)
  - Total: 85
  - Density: 18.9/sq mi (7.29/km^{2})
- Time zone: UTC-7 (Mountain (MST))
  - Summer (DST): UTC-6 (MDT)
- Area code: 406
- FIPS code: 30-38480
- GNIS feature ID: 2583818

Indian Springs is a census-designated place (CDP) in Lincoln County, Montana, United States. As of the 2020 census, Indian Springs had a population of 85.

The CDP is located on U.S. Route 93.

== Demographics ==
Historical population
Census	Pop.	Note	%±
2020	85		—
U.S. Decennial Census
