= Happys Inn, Montana =

- Census-designated place
- Location within Montana Location within the United States
- Coordinates: 48°02′58″N 115°07′10″W
- Country: United States
- State: Montana
- County: Lincoln

Area
  - Total: 12.45 sq mi (32.24 km^{2})
  - Land: 9.81 sq mi (25.40 km^{2})
  - Water: 2.64 sq mi (6.84 km^{2})
- Elevation: 3,333 ft (1,016 m)

Population (2020)
  - Total: 179
  - Density: 18.3/sq mi (7.05/km^{2})
- Time zone: UTC-7 (Mountain (MST))
  - Summer (DST): UTC-6 (MDT)
- Area code: 406
- FIPS code: 30-34110
- GNIS feature ID: 2583813

Happys Inn is a census-designated place (CDP) in Lincoln County, Montana, United States. As of the 2020 census, Happys Inn had a population of 179.

Happys Inn has a bar that carries its namesake. The census area extends for 12 miles (19 km) down the length of the chain of lakes area of Lincoln County. The community is along U.S. Route 2, 40 miles (64 km) southeast of Libby, the Lincoln county seat, and 49 miles (79 km) west of Kalispell.

According to the U.S. Census Bureau, the CDP has a total area of 12.4 square miles (32.2 km^{2}), of which 9.8 square miles (25.4 km^{2}) are land and 2.6 square miles (6.8 km^{2}), or 21.22%, are water.

== Climate ==
Libby 32 SSE is a weather station near Happy's Inn, situated at an elevation of 3440 feet (1049 m).

Climate data for Libby 32 SSE, Montana, 1991–2020 normals, 1910-2020 extremes: 3440ft (1049m)
Month	Jan	Feb	Mar	Apr	May	Jun	Jul	Aug	Sep	Oct	Nov	Dec	Year
Record high °F (°C)	58 (14)	59 (15)	74 (23)	87 (31)	89 (32)	97 (36)	98 (37)	102 (39)	100 (38)	81 (27)	65 (18)	53 (12)	102 (39)
Mean maximum °F (°C)	44.9 (7.2)	49.1 (9.5)	58.5 (14.7)	71.0 (21.7)	80.2 (26.8)	84.7 (29.3)	90.4 (32.4)	90.2 (32.3)	83.6 (28.7)	72.1 (22.3)	54.0 (12.2)	43.7 (6.5)	91.9 (33.3)
Mean daily maximum °F (°C)	30.4 (−0.9)	34.7 (1.5)	43.0 (6.1)	52.5 (11.4)	62.4 (16.9)	68.5 (20.3)	77.9 (25.5)	77.8 (25.4)	67.4 (19.7)	51.8 (11.0)	36.9 (2.7)	28.8 (−1.8)	52.7 (11.5)
Daily mean °F (°C)	22.7 (−5.2)	24.9 (−3.9)	32.5 (0.3)	40.1 (4.5)	48.4 (9.1)	54.0 (12.2)	59.8 (15.4)	58.7 (14.8)	50.6 (10.3)	39.5 (4.2)	29.4 (−1.4)	22.1 (−5.5)	40.2 (4.6)
Mean daily minimum °F (°C)	14.9 (−9.5)	15.1 (−9.4)	21.9 (−5.6)	27.7 (−2.4)	34.3 (1.3)	39.5 (4.2)	41.7 (5.4)	39.5 (4.2)	33.8 (1.0)	27.3 (−2.6)	22.0 (−5.6)	15.3 (−9.3)	27.8 (−2.4)
Mean minimum °F (°C)	−13.9 (−25.5)	−11.6 (−24.2)	1.0 (−17.2)	13.6 (−10.2)	21.6 (−5.8)	27.8 (−2.3)	31.1 (−0.5)	27.8 (−2.3)	20.1 (−6.6)	8.2 (−13.2)	−1.3 (−18.5)	−10.0 (−23.3)	−23.9 (−31.1)
Record low °F (°C)	−44 (−42)	−40 (−40)	−28 (−33)	−2 (−19)	8 (−13)	21 (−6)	26 (−3)	22 (−6)	8 (−13)	−15 (−26)	−26 (−32)	−43 (−42)	−44 (−42)
Average precipitation inches (mm)	2.12 (54)	1.84 (47)	2.17 (55)	1.62 (41)	2.09 (53)	1.98 (50)	0.78 (20)	0.84 (21)	1.19 (30)	2.15 (55)	2.94 (75)	2.59 (66)	22.31 (567)
Average snowfall inches (cm)	17.70 (45.0)	14.20 (36.1)	14.60 (37.1)	5.20 (13.2)	0.50 (1.3)	0.20 (0.51)	0.00 (0.00)	0.00 (0.00)	0.00 (0.00)	3.00 (7.6)	15.40 (39.1)	21.90 (55.6)	92.7 (235.51)
Source 1: NOAA
Source 2: XMACIS2 (records & monthly max/mins)

== Demographics ==
Historical population
Census	Pop.	Note	%±
2020	179		—
U.S. Decennial Census
