= Pioneer Junction, Montana =

- Census-designated place
- Location within Montana Location within the United States
- Coordinates: 48°18′57″N 115°31′06″W
- Country: United States
- State: Montana
- County: Lincoln

Area
  - Total: 3.53 sq mi (9.13 km^{2})
  - Land: 3.53 sq mi (9.13 km^{2})
  - Water: 0 sq mi (0.00 km^{2})
- Elevation: 2,438 ft (743 m)

Population (2020)
  - Total: 902
  - Density: 255.9/sq mi (98.82/km^{2})
- Time zone: UTC-7 (Mountain (MST))
  - Summer (DST): UTC-6 (MDT)
- Area code: 406
- FIPS code: 30-57950
- GNIS feature ID: 2583833

Pioneer Junction is a census-designated place (CDP) in Lincoln County, Montana, United States. As of the 2020 census, Pioneer Junction had a population of 902.

== Geography ==
The community is south of the center of Lincoln County, along U.S. Route 2. It is bordered to the north by the White Haven CDP. Libby, the county seat, is 4 miles (6 km) to the north via US 2 westbound, and Kalispell is 84 miles (135 km) eastbound on US 2.

According to the U.S. Census Bureau, the Pioneer Junction CDP has an area of 3.5 square miles (9.1 km^{2}), all land. It sits between two creeks, Libby Creek to the east and its tributary, Big Cherry Creek, to the west. Libby Creek flows north to the Kootenai River at Libby and is part of the Columbia River watershed.

== Demographics ==
Historical population
Census	Pop.	Note	%±
2020	902		—
U.S. Decennial Census
