= Eureka Community Hall =

- U.S. National Register of Historic Places
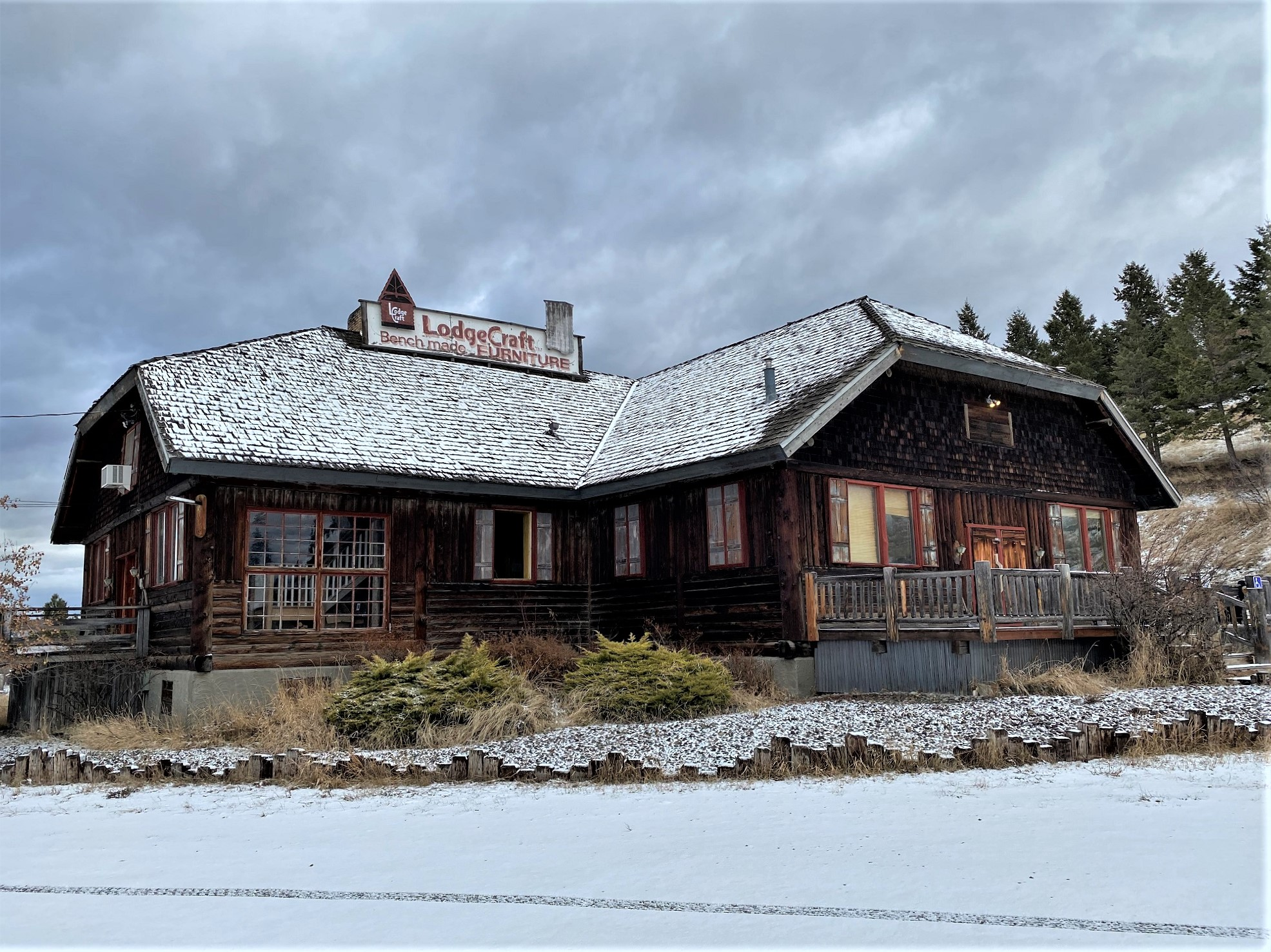

- Location within Montana Location within the United States
- Location: Cliff St., Eureka, Montana
- Coordinates: 48°52′46″N 115°02′00″W
- Area: less than one acre
- Built: 1942
- Architectural style: Rustic
- NRHP reference No.: 85003236
- Added to NRHP: October 18, 1985

The Eureka Community Hall is a site on the National Register of Historic Places located in Eureka, Montana. It was added to the Register on October 18, 1985.

It is a one-story log structure built in 1942 with support of the Works Project Administration.

Its 1983 NRHP nomination asserts:

The Eureka Community hall is of exceptional local historical and architectural significance because it is the primary building in this remote, northwestern Montana community that represents the conscious decision of the community to build a structure that serves both its social needs and as an expression of the citizens' cultural values. This finely detailed, Rustic Style, log building stands in a commanding position on a hill overlooking the commercial district of the small northwestern Montana town of Eureka. It is the most substantial and well crafted building in Eureka and is a major visual component of this community's identity.
