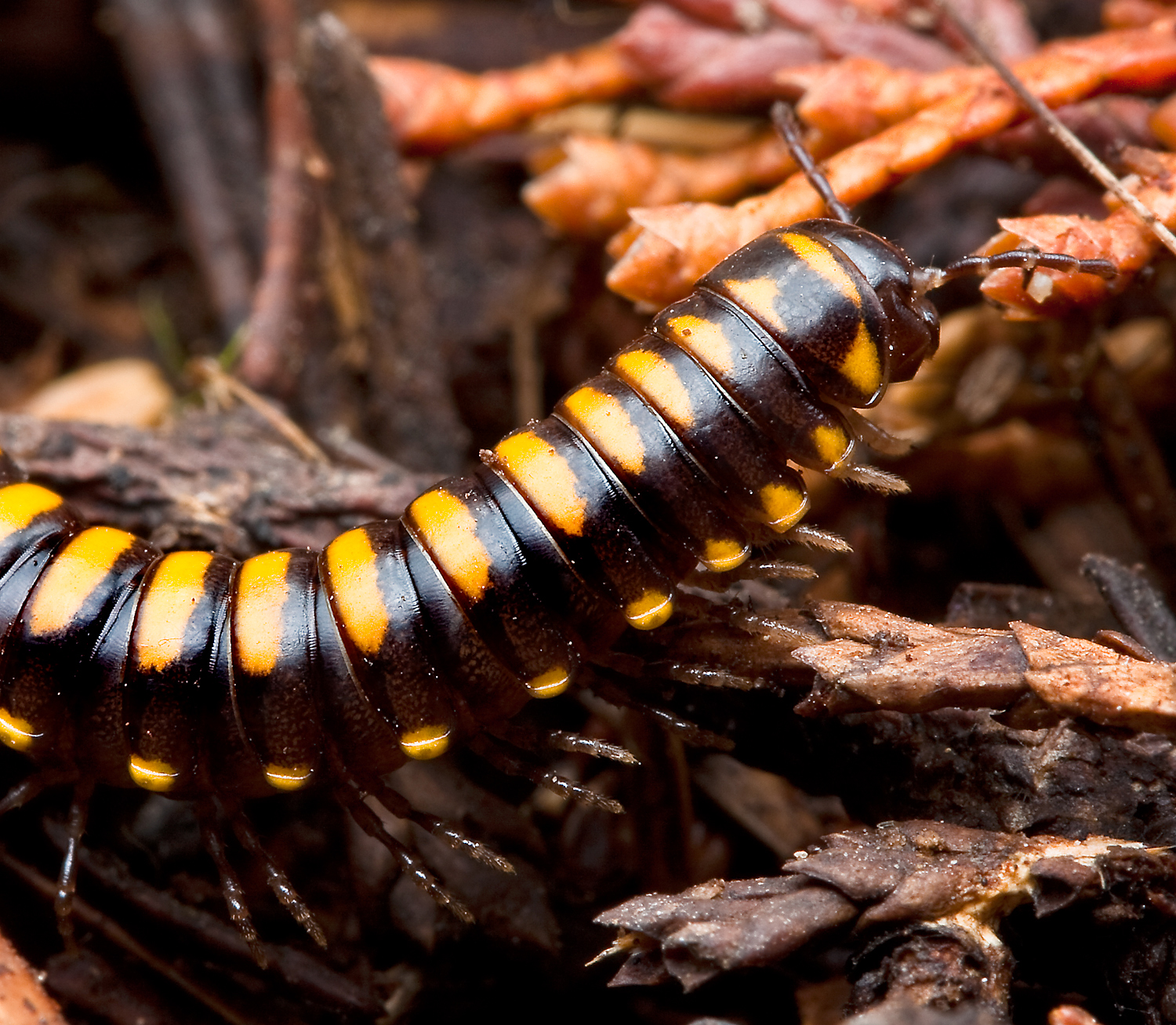

Scientific classification
- Kingdom: Animalia
- Phylum: Arthropoda
- Subphylum: Myriapoda
- Class: Diplopoda
- Order: Polydesmida
- Family: Xystodesmidae
- Genus: Orophe
- Species: O. unicus

Binomial name
- Orophe unicus Loomis, 1953

Synonyms
- Species synonymy: Chipus unicus; Orophe cabinetus

= Orophe unicus =

Species of millipede

Orophe unicus is a species of millipede in the family Xystodesmidae, which is found in the Rocky Mountains of northern Idaho. The species was originally described as Chipus unicus by H.F. Loomis in 1953 and was later transferred to Orophe by R.L. Hoffman in 1964. Hoffman also suggested that the differences in the gonopods of O. unicus and O. cabinetus were minor and so the relationship between the two may be "subspecific". Loomis and Schmidt later synonymized O. unicus under O. cabinetus based on the subtle nature of this feature. In 1993, Rowland Shelley reexamined the type specimens and based on the differences in the gonopods as well as the allopatric nature of the two populations, reinstated O. unicus as a valid species.

== Description ==
Orophe unicus is a robust Xystodesmid millipede that superficially looks identical to its sister species, Orophe cabinetus. The two species are only differentiated by a slight difference in the structure of gonopod and by their range, with O. unicus occurring in northern Idaho. Recent observations on INaturalist have shown that the ranges may be closer than was suggested by R Shelley.

The segments of O. unicus are brown to black in background color with a lighter yellow to orange spot on the caudal portion of the metatergite and matching color of the paranota. The paranota of the first few segments are broad and nearly contacting the adjacent segment, but the paranota of the later segments become more narrow and widely separated. The paranota also arise low on the segments and are noticeably depressed, giving the millipede a domed appearance.

== Range ==
Based on the description from Shelley 1993, the species was known to occur from southern Benewah and south eastern Shoshone counties, south through Latah and Clearwater counties into northern Idaho county. Observations on iNaturalist have also found the species further north and east in both Benewah and Shoshone counties and up into Kootenai and Bonner counties. There is also a small population in Spokane county that is currently in question by some iNaturalist users.

== Habitat ==
As with other Xystodesmids in the area, O. unicus inhabits forested areas near rivers and creeks but little is known about the specific habitat requirements or preferences.
