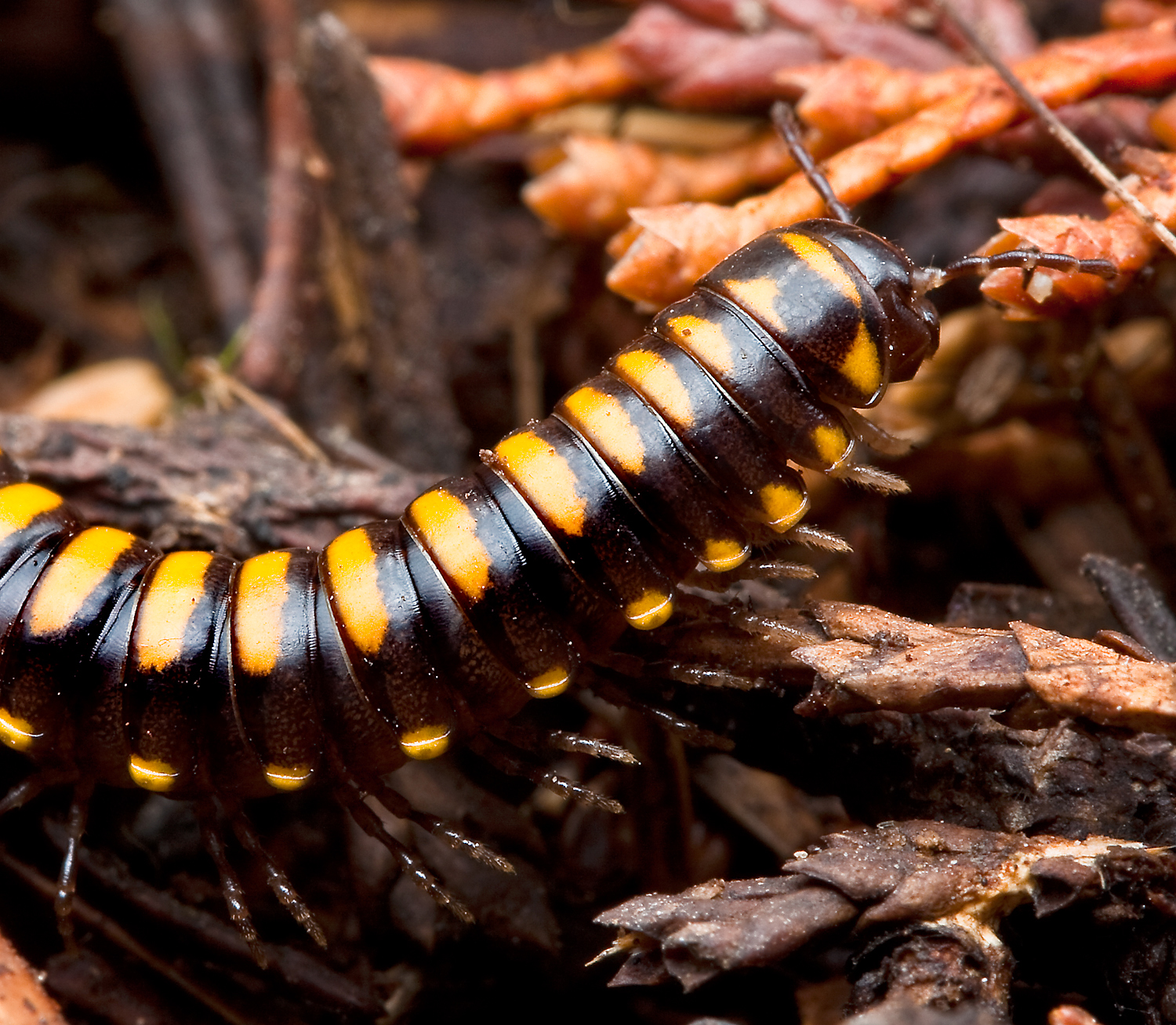

Scientific classification
- Kingdom: Animalia
- Phylum: Arthropoda
- Subphylum: Myriapoda
- Class: Diplopoda
- Order: Polydesmida
- Family: Xystodesmidae
- Tribe: Xystodesmini
- Genus: Orophe; Chamberlin, 1951

Type species
- Orophe cabinetus Chamberlin, 1951

Synonyms
- Chipus

= Orophe =

Genus of millipedes

Orophe is a genus of Xystodesmid millipede found in the Rocky Mountains of northern Idaho and western Montana.

== Description ==
Orophe is genus of robust Xystodesmid millipedes with two species. The two species are superficially similar. Both are large millipedes with bodies that taper slightly towards the posterior. The paranota are short, noticeably depressed, and arise low on the tergite, giving the millipedes a domed appearance. Both species are share a similar color pattern with yellow paranota and a yellow central oval patch on the tergites. The two species differ only in features of the gonopods.

== Taxonomy ==
Orophe contains the following species:

- Orophe unicus
- Orophe cabinetus
