= Farmers and Merchants State Bank (Eureka, Montana) =

- U.S. National Register of Historic Places
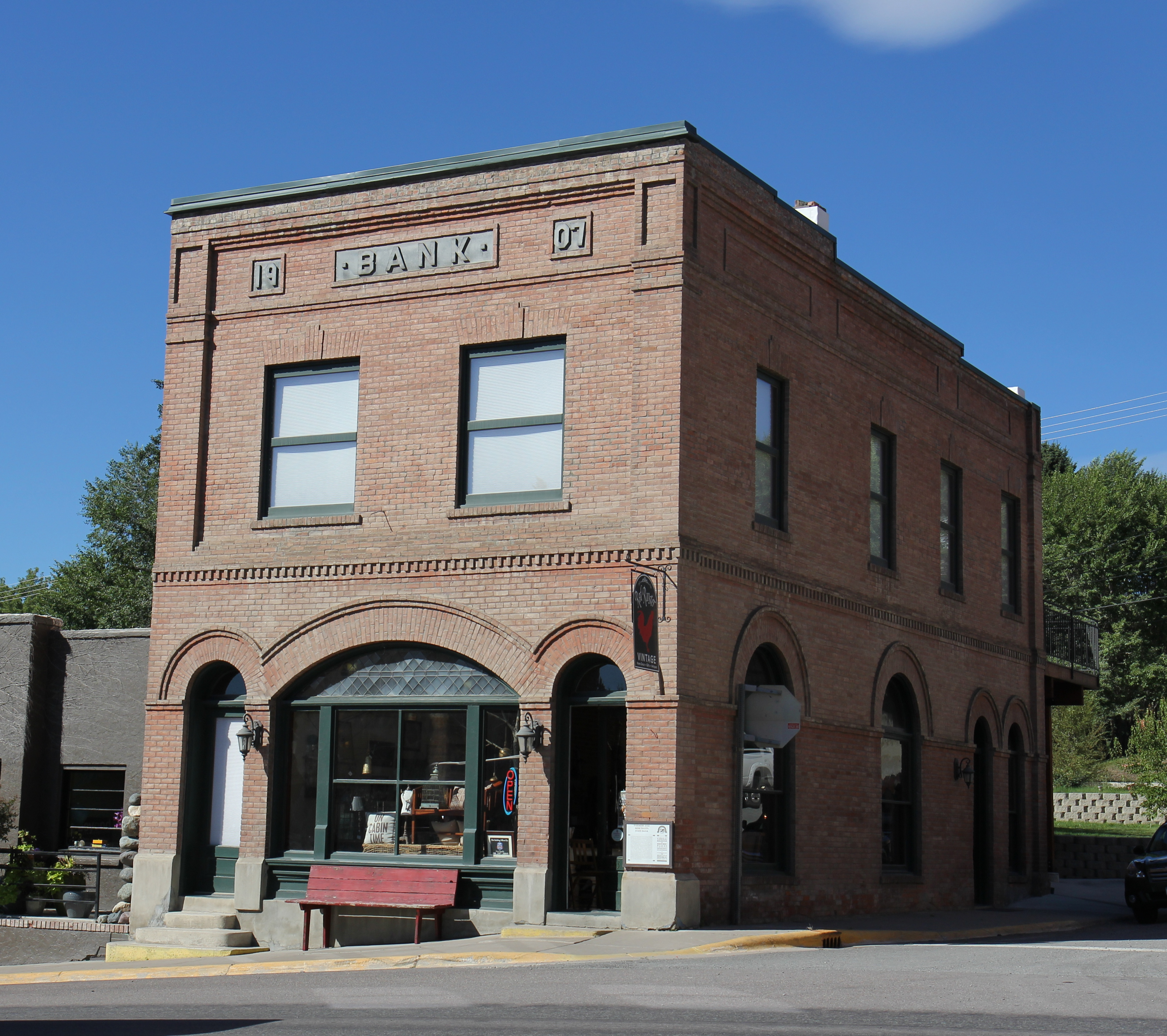
- Bank in 2013

- Location within Montana Location within the United States
- Location: 223 Dewey Ave., Eureka, Montana
- Coordinates: 48°52′50″N 115°03′08″W
- Area: less than one acre
- Built: 1907-1908
- Built by: Blake & Son
- Architectural style: Western Commercial
- NRHP reference No.: 95001062
- Added to NRHP: August 31, 1995

The Farmers and Merchants State Bank is a bank building in Eureka, Montana. It was added to the National Register of Historic Places August 31, 1995.

It was deemed "an excellent and well preserved example of Western Commercial styling, representative of many such small town banks which proliferated throughout Montana during the early 20th century."

It was built with bricks manufactured two miles south of Eureka, from local clay. The building cost $12,000 and was built by Blake and Son of Kalispell, Montana.

Heavy investment by the bank in agricultural irrigation, plus the closure of the Eureka Lumber Mill in 1923, led in the bank's failure in 1925.
