= KZXT =

Coordinates: 48°54′01″N 115°01′21″W

- Eureka, Montana; United States
- Frequency: 93.5 MHz
- Branding: Z93

Programming
- Format: Adult contemporary
- Affiliations: SRN News

Ownership
- Owner: Anderson Radio Broadcasting, Inc.

History
- First air date: 2010
- Former call signs: KWDE (2006–2008, CP)

Technical information
- Licensing authority: FCC
- Facility ID: 164302
- Class: A
- ERP: 2,000 watts
- HAAT: −210 meters (−690 ft)

Links
- Public license information: Public file; LMS
- Webcast: Listen live
- Website: kzxt93.com

KZXT (93.5 FM) is a radio station airing an adult contemporary format licensed to Eureka, Montana. The station is owned by Anderson Radio Broadcasting, Inc.
