= White Haven, Montana =

- Census-designated place
- Location within Montana Location within the United States
- Coordinates: 48°20′52″N 115°30′58″W
- Country: United States
- State: Montana
- County: Lincoln

Area
  - Total: 0.99 sq mi (2.56 km^{2})
  - Land: 0.99 sq mi (2.56 km^{2})
  - Water: 0 sq mi (0.00 km^{2})
- Elevation: 2,228 ft (679 m)

Population (2020)
  - Total: 499
  - Density: 503.9/sq mi (194.55/km^{2})
- Time zone: UTC-7 (Mountain (MST))
  - Summer (DST): UTC-6 (MDT)
- Area code: 406
- FIPS code: 30-79935
- GNIS feature ID: 2583866

White Haven is an unincorporated community and census-designated place (CDP) in Lincoln County, Montana, United States. As of the 2020 census, White Haven had a population of 499.

== Geography ==
White Haven is south of the center of Lincoln County, in the valley of Libby Creek. It is bordered to the south by the Pioneer Junction CDP, and the city of Libby, the Lincoln county seat, is 3.5 miles (5.6 km) to the north. U.S. Route 2 passes through White Haven, leading north (westbound) to Libby and southeast 85 miles (137 km) to Kalispell.

According to the U.S. Census Bureau, the CDP has an area of 1.0 square mile (2.6 km^{2}), all land. Via Libby Creek, the community is part of the Kootenai River watershed, flowing to the Columbia River.

== Demographics ==
Historical population
| Census | Pop. | Note | %± |
|---|---|---|---|
| 2020 | 499 | | — |
U.S. Decennial Census
