= Stryker, Montana =

- Census-designated place
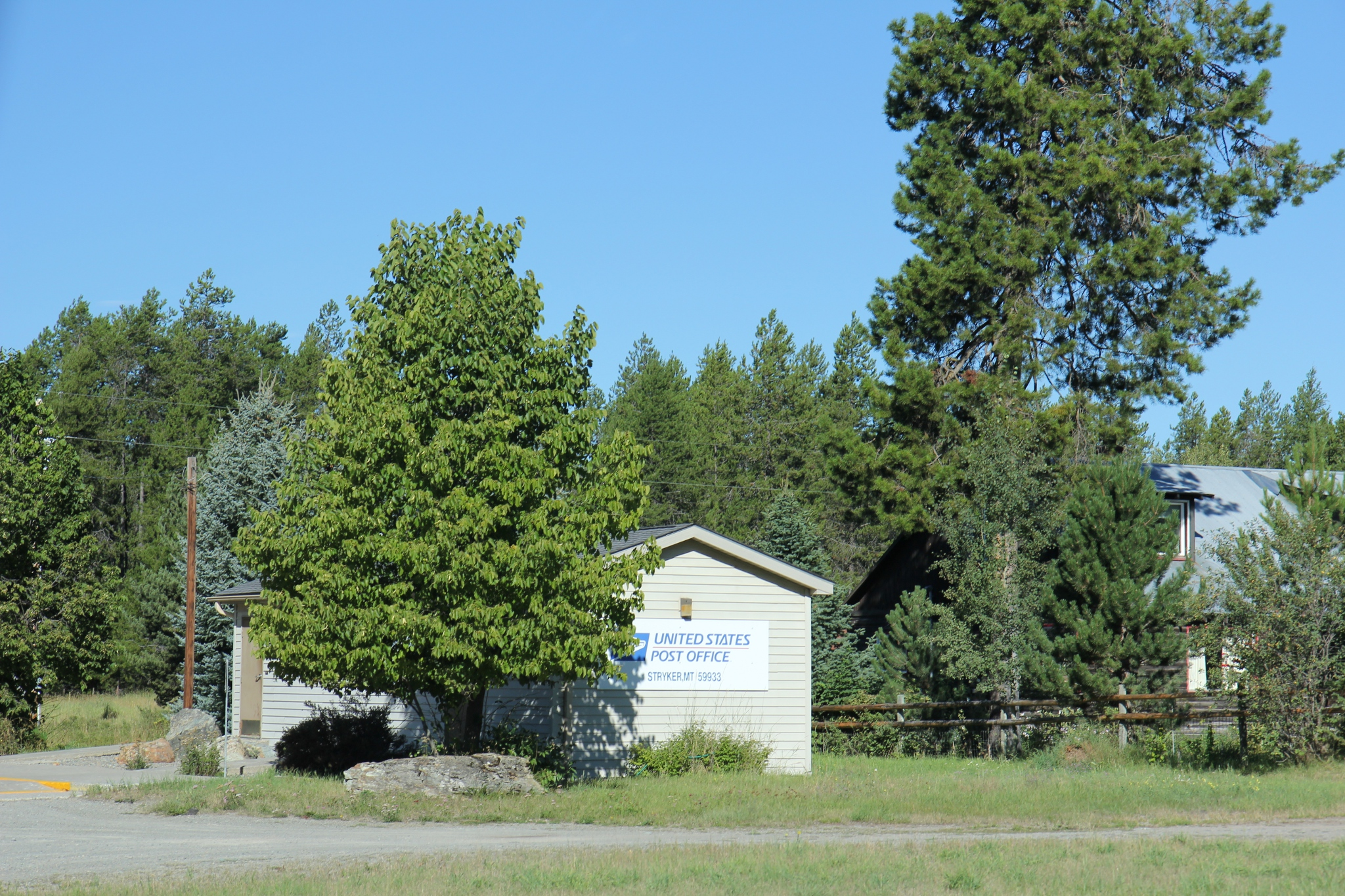
- Stryker post office

- Location within Montana Location within the United States
- Coordinates: 48°40′15″N 114°45′40″W
- Country: United States
- State: Montana
- County: Lincoln

Area
  - Total: 1.03 sq mi (2.67 km^{2})
  - Land: 1.03 sq mi (2.67 km^{2})
  - Water: 0 sq mi (0.00 km^{2})
- Elevation: 3,307 ft (1,008 m)

Population (2020)
  - Total: 25
  - Density: 24.3/sq mi (9.37/km^{2})
- Time zone: UTC-7 (Mountain (MST))
  - Summer (DST): UTC-6 (MDT)
- ZIP code: 59933
- Area code: 406
- GNIS feature ID: 2583853
- FIPS code: 30-71575

Stryker is an unincorporated community and census-designated place (CDP) in Lincoln County, Montana, United States. As of the 2020 census, Stryker had a population of 25. Stryker has the 59933 ZIP code.

Named for local homesteaders, Stryker served as a stage station on the Kalispell–Fort Steele (British Columbia) trail. A forest fire swept through the town in 1926. Stryker’s railroad depot closed with the construction of Libby Dam.

== Geography ==
Stryker is located in northeastern Lincoln County on U.S. Route 93, 20 miles (32 km) southeast of Eureka and 45 miles (72 km) northwest of Kalispell. It is located just south of a drainage divide separating the Stillwater River, which runs just east of Stryker and flows southeast to the Flathead River, from Summit Creek, which flows northwest and is part of the Tobacco River watershed flowing to the Kootenai River. According to the U.S. Census Bureau, the Stryker CDP has an area of 1.0 square mile (2.7 km^{2}), all land.

== Demographics ==
Historical population
Census	Pop.	Note	%±
2020	25		—
U.S. Decennial Census

== Images ==
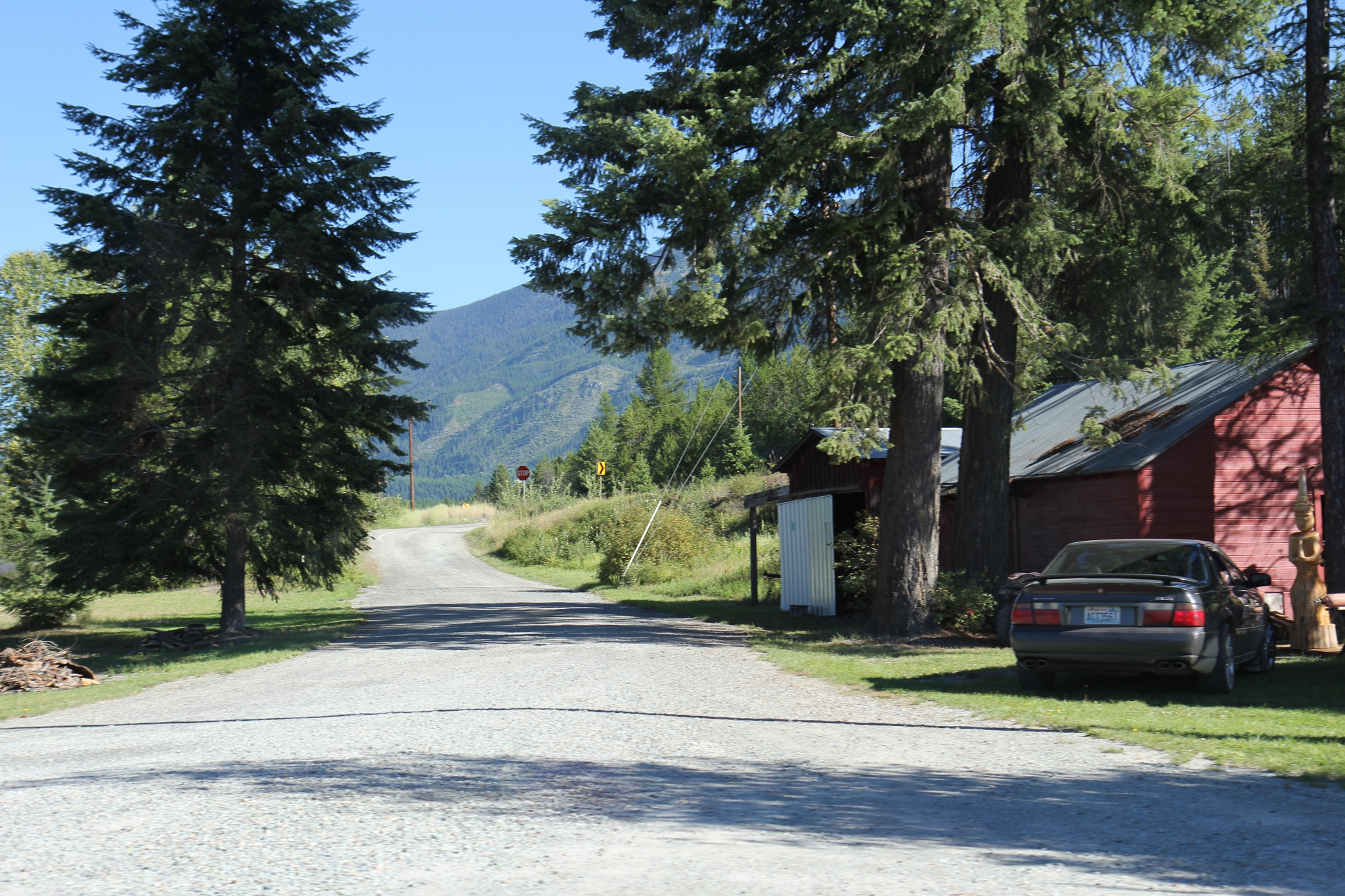
A building in Stryker

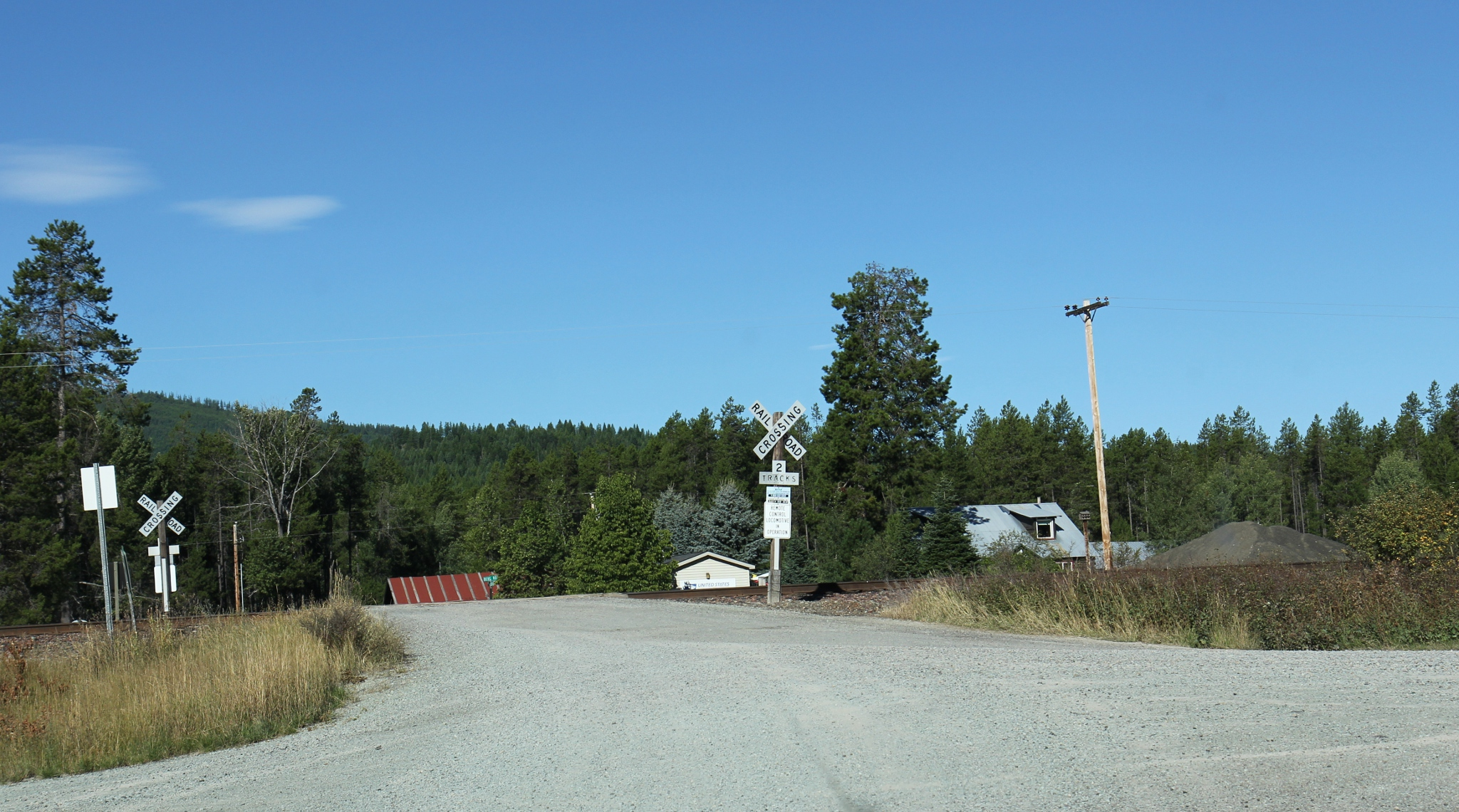
Railroad crossing
