= Yaak River =

River in Montana, United States and British Columbia, Canada

Yaak River Yahk River
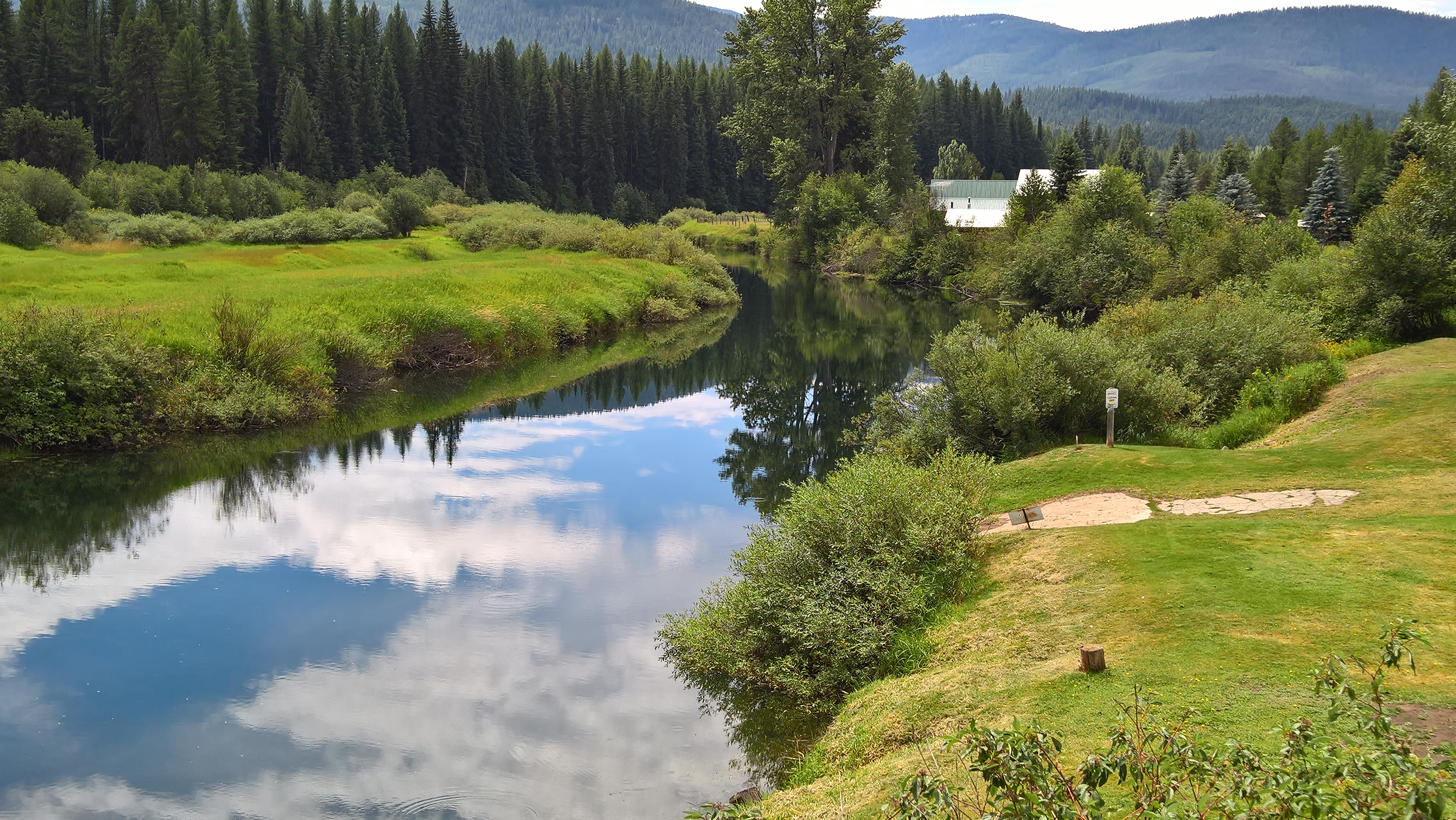
- Yaak River at Yaak, Montana

Location
- Country: United States, Canada
- State: Montana
- Province: British Columbia

Physical characteristics
- Source: Purcell Mountains
  - location: Yahk Mountain
  - coordinates: 49°12′35″N 115°42′41″W
  - elevation: 4,910 ft (1,500 m)
- Mouth: Kootenai River
  - location: Troy, Montana
  - coordinates: 48°33′40″N 115°58′37″W
  - elevation: 1,838 ft (560 m)
- Basin size: 766 sq mi (1,980 km^{2})
- Discharge
  - location: mouth (near Troy, MT)
  - average: 850 cu ft/s (24 m^{3}/s)
  - minimum: 49 cu ft/s (1.4 m^{3}/s)
  - maximum: 11,600 cu ft/s (330 m^{3}/s)

Basin features
- Tributaries
  - left: East Fork Yaak River, South Fork Yaak River
  - right: West Fork Yaak River

The Yaak River (spelled Yahk River in Canada) is a tributary of the Kootenai River in Montana.

== Course ==
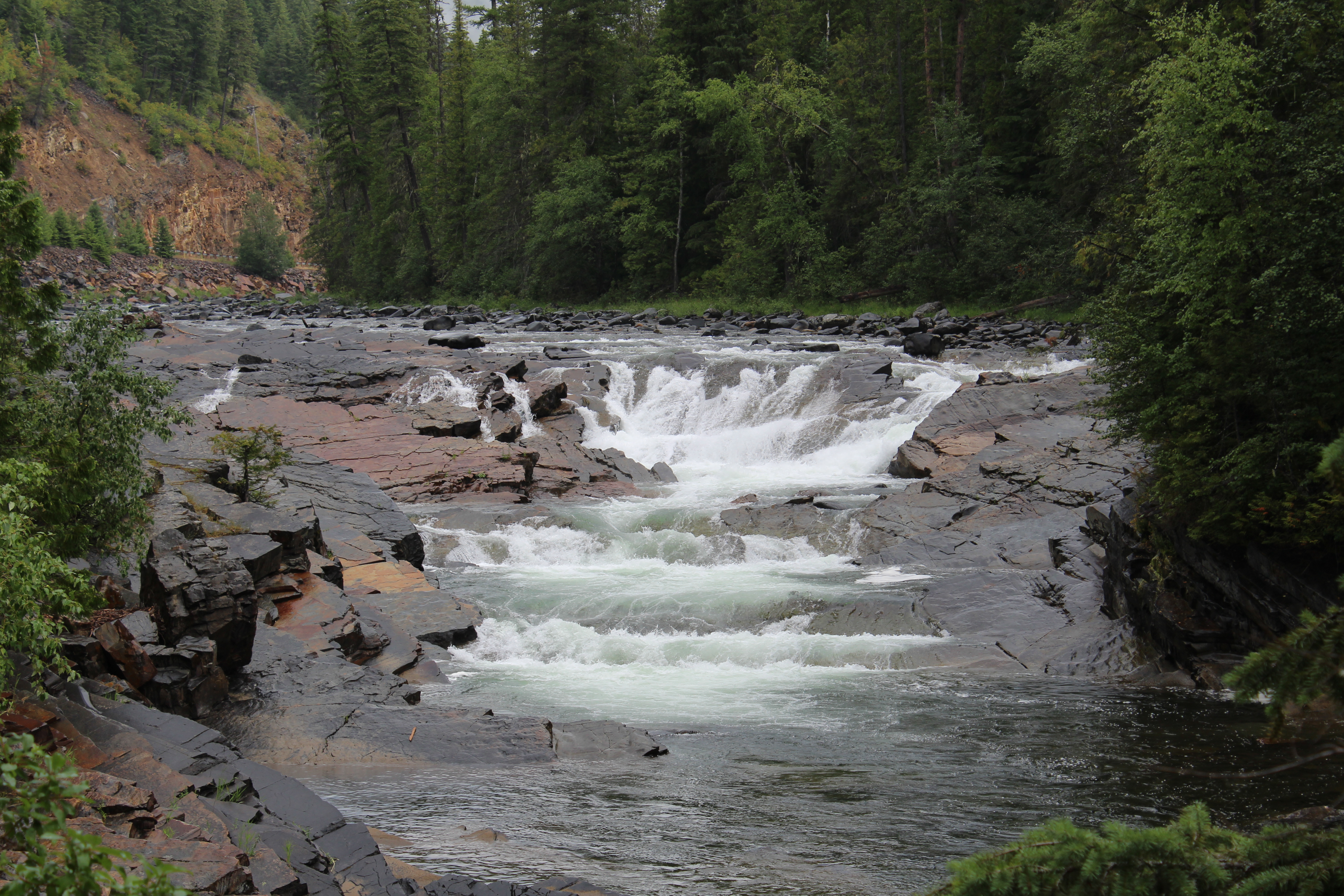
Yaak River at Upper Yaak Falls

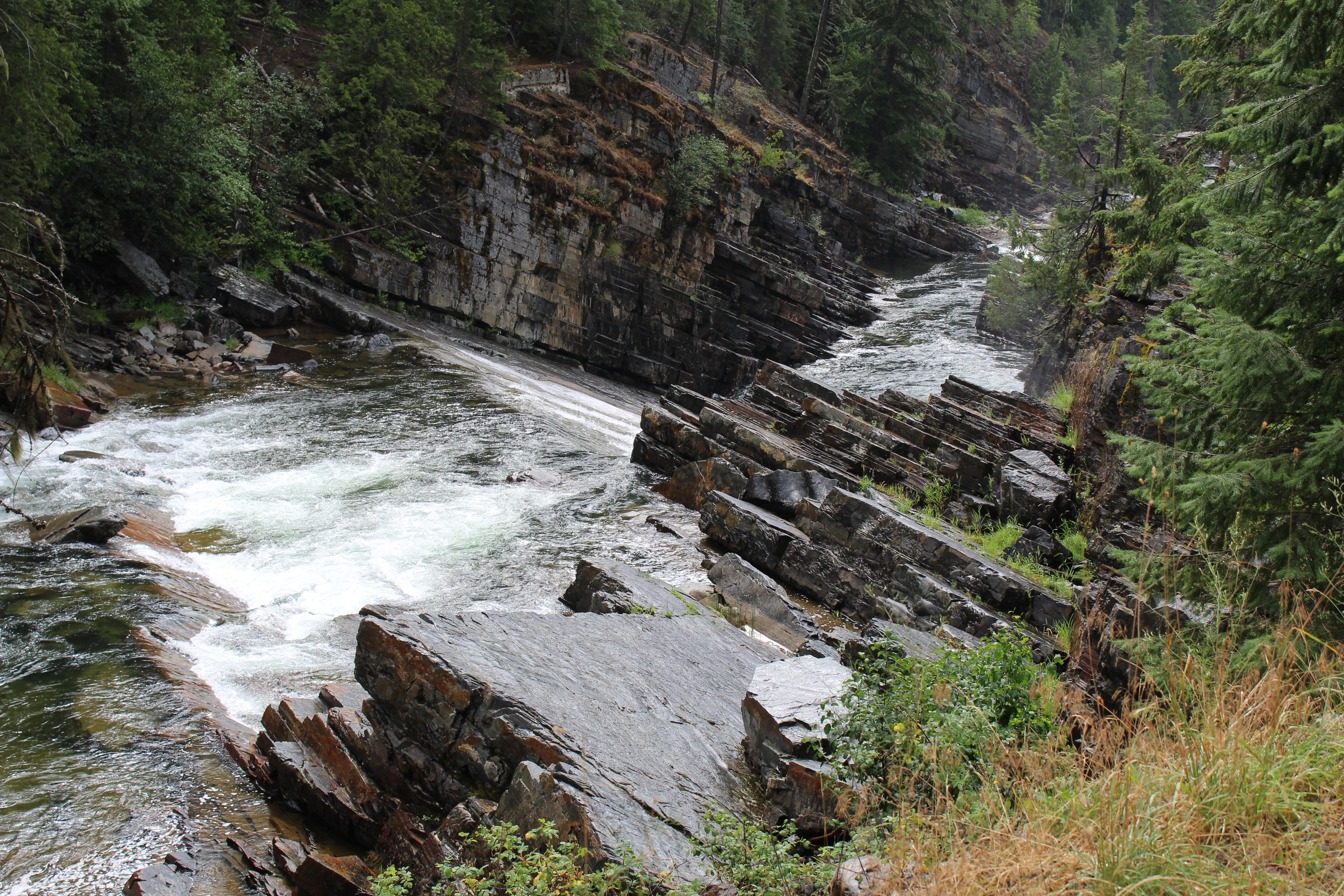
Yaak River at Lower Yaak Falls

The Yaak River originates near Yahk Mountain, in the Yahk Range, part of the Purcell Mountains, in southeast British Columbia. The river flows south, crossing into Lincoln County, Montana. It receives the East Fork Yaak River, then the West Fork Yaak River (also called the West Yahk River). The West Fork originates in Montana near Rock Candy Mountain, flows northeast into British Columbia, then southeast back into Montana to join the main Yaak River.

Below the West Fork confluence, the Yaak River receives the South Fork Yaak River before curving broadly west, then south, receiving numerous tributary creeks such as Spread Creek, Hellroaring Creek, and Burnt Creek (also called Burnt Grizzly Bear Creek), before flowing into the Kootenai River near Yaak Mountain and the small city of Troy, Montana.

In Montana, the Yaak River and its tributaries mostly lie within Kootenai National Forest.

The river has Class IV-V whitewater. The river is Class III-V from Yaak Falls to its confluence with the Kootenai River for the purposes of public access for recreational purposes.

== History ==
According to British Columbia's Geographical Names Information System, "Yahk" is a Kootenai word meaning either "arrow" or "bow" and referring either to the Yaak River or the Kootenai River. The southward curve of the Kootenai River (from Canada into the United States and back into Canada) is said to be a "bow", with the Yaak River possibly being the "arrow" (if the name is from the Kootenai word "a'k").

According to the USGS, variant names of the Yaak River include A'ak, Yaac, Yahk, Yahkh, and Yak.

== See also ==
- Montana Stream Access Law
- List of rivers of Montana
- List of rivers of British Columbia
