= Lincoln County, Montana =

County in Montana, United States

- County
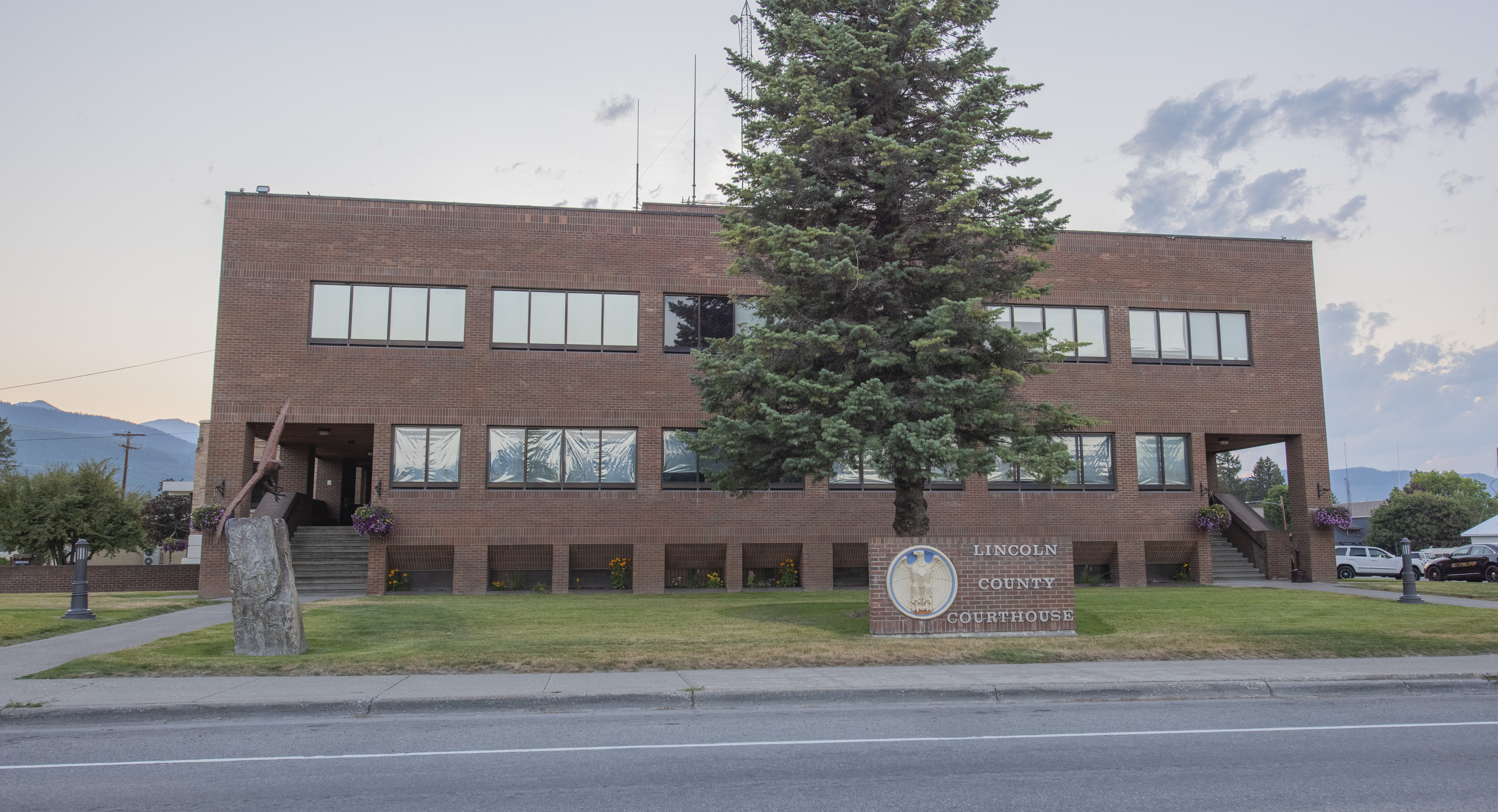
- Lincoln County Courthouse

- Location within the U.S. state of Montana
- Coordinates: 48°32′N 115°25′W
- Country: United States
- State: Montana
- Founded: March 9, 1909
- Named for: Abraham Lincoln
- Seat: Libby
- Largest city: Libby

Area
  - Total: 3,675 sq mi (9,520 km^{2})
  - Land: 3,613 sq mi (9,360 km^{2})
  - Water: 62 sq mi (160 km^{2}) 1.7%

Population (2020)
  - Total: 19,677
  - Estimate (2025): 22,328 ▲
  - Density: 5.446/sq mi (2.103/km^{2})
- Time zone: UTC−7 (Mountain)
  - Summer (DST): UTC−6 (MDT)
- Congressional district: 1st
- Website: www.lincolncountymt.us
- Montana county number 56, the highest county number

Lincoln County is a county located in the U.S. state of Montana. As of the 2020 census, the population was 19,677. Its county seat is Libby. The county was founded in 1909 and named for President Abraham Lincoln. The county lies on Montana's north border and thus shares the US-Canadian border with the Canadian province of British Columbia.

This heavily wooded and mountainous county once was part of Flathead County until residents of Libby and Eureka petitioned the state legislature for separation. Libby won an election over Eureka to host the county seat.

== Geography ==
According to the United States Census Bureau, the county has a total area of 3,675 square miles (9,520 km^{2}), of which 3,615 square miles (9,360 km^{2}) is land and 62 square miles (160 km^{2}) (1.7%) is water. The county borders the Canadian province of British Columbia to the north. The lowest point in the state of Montana is located on the Kootenai River in Lincoln County, where it flows out of Montana and into Idaho. Upstream, Libby Dam backs up huge Lake Koocanusa (combination name of Kootenai, Canada, USA) into Canada's British Columbia.

=== Adjacent counties and county-equivalents ===
- Regional District of Central Kootenay, British Columbia – northwest
- Regional District of East Kootenay, British Columbia – north
- Flathead County – east
- Sanders County – south
- Bonner County, Idaho – southwest/Pacific Time Border
- Boundary County, Idaho – northwest/Pacific Time Border

=== National protected areas ===
- Pacific Northwest National Scenic Trail (part)
- Flathead National Forest (part)
- Kaniksu National Forest (part)
- Kootenai National Forest (part)

== Economics ==
=== Top employers ===
In 2003, the top employers are listed in the table below.

#	Employer	# of Employees
1	Kootenai National Forest	276
2	Libby Public School District	203
3	St John's Lutheran Hospital	182
4	Lincoln County Government	135
5	Owens & Hurst Lumber	120

== Demographics ==
Historical population
Census	Pop.	Note	%±
1910	3,638		—
1920	7,797		114.3%
1930	7,089		−9.1%
1940	7,882		11.2%
1950	8,693		10.3%
1960	12,537		44.2%
1970	18,063		44.1%
1980	17,752		−1.7%
1990	17,481		−1.5%
2000	18,837		7.8%
2010	19,687		4.5%
2020	19,677		−0.1%
2025 (est.)	22,328	▲	13.5%
U.S. Decennial Census; 1790–1960 1900–1990; 1990–2000 2010–2020

=== 2020 census ===
As of the 2020 census, the county had a population of 19,677. Of the residents, 18.5% were under the age of 18 and 30.3% were 65 years of age or older; the median age was 54.0 years. For every 100 females there were 101.4 males, and for every 100 females age 18 and over there were 100.5 males. 22.1% of residents lived in urban areas and 77.9% lived in rural areas.

The racial makeup of the county was 91.2% White, 0.2% Black or African American, 1.1% American Indian and Alaska Native, 0.5% Asian, 0.9% from some other race, and 5.9% from two or more races. Hispanic or Latino residents of any race comprised 2.9% of the population.

There were 8,886 households in the county, of which 20.4% had children under the age of 18 living with them and 22.5% had a female householder with no spouse or partner present. About 32.3% of all households were made up of individuals and 17.4% had someone living alone who was 65 years of age or older.

There were 10,953 housing units, of which 18.9% were vacant. Among occupied housing units, 78.1% were owner-occupied and 21.9% were renter-occupied. The homeowner vacancy rate was 1.5% and the rental vacancy rate was 6.9%.

=== 2010 census ===
As of the 2010 census, there were 19,687 people, 8,843 households, and 5,608 families living in the county. The population density was 5.4 inhabitants per square mile (2.1/km^{2}). There were 11,413 housing units at an average density of 3.2 units per square mile (1.2 units/km^{2}). The racial makeup of the county was 95.9% white, 0.9% American Indian, 0.3% Asian, 0.1% black or African American, 0.4% from other races, and 2.3% from two or more races. Those of Hispanic or Latino origin made up 2.3% of the population. In terms of ancestry, 31.5% were German, 15.7% were Irish, 15.3% were English, 10.2% were Norwegian, and 3.3% were American.

Of the 8,843 households, 23.2% had children under the age of 18 living with them, 52.0% were married couples living together, 7.4% had a female householder with no husband present, 36.6% were non-families, and 30.6% of all households were made up of individuals. The average household size was 2.20 and the average family size was 2.72. The median age was 48.9 years.

The median income for a household in the county was $30,823 and the median income for a family was $39,600. Males had a median income of $40,944 versus $24,965 for females. The per capita income for the county was $19,626. About 13.7% of families and 18.6% of the population were below the poverty line, including 28.2% of those under age 18 and 12.1% of those age 65 or over.

== Communities ==
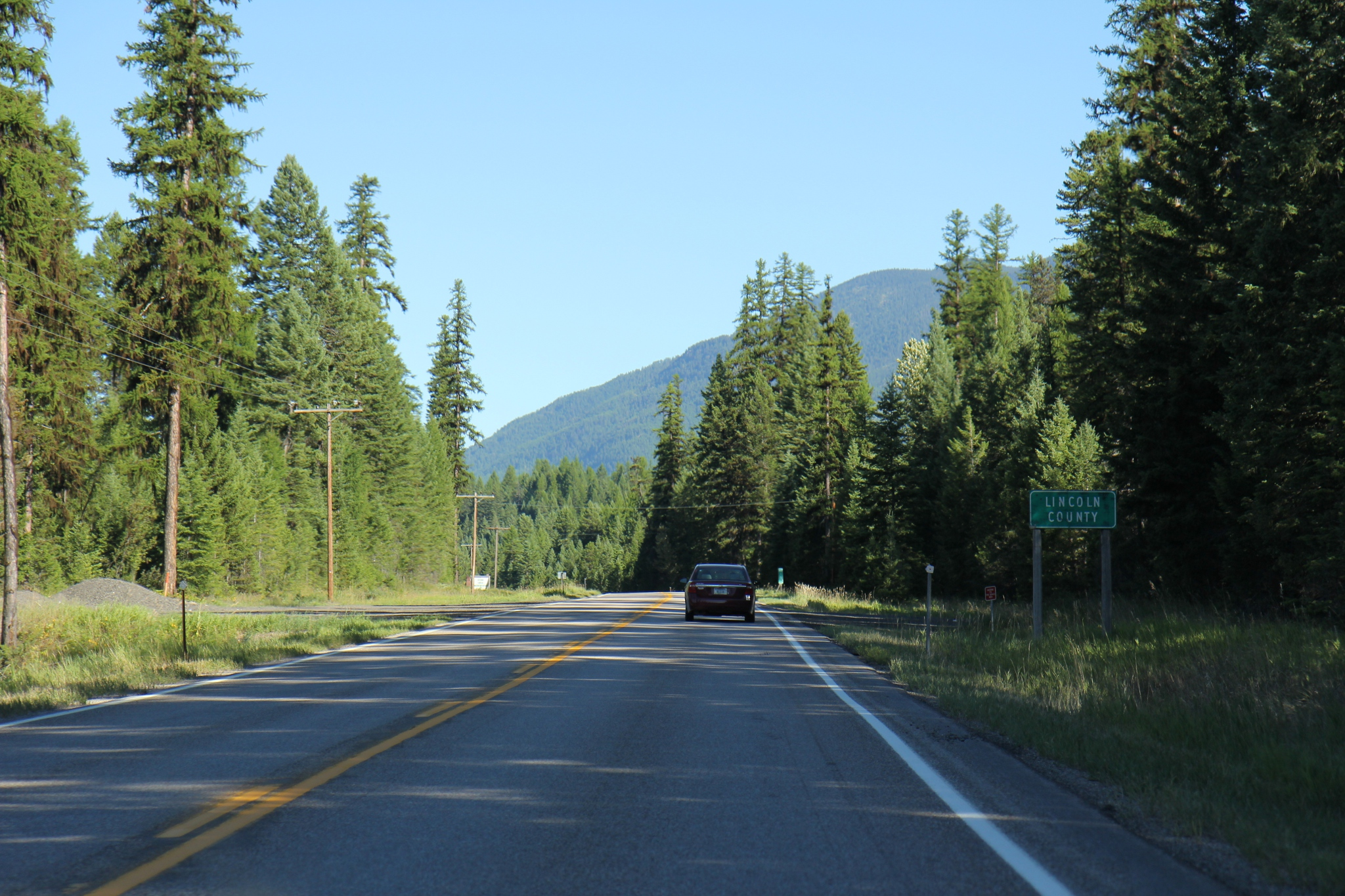
Welcome sign for Lincoln County on U.S. Route 93

=== Cities ===
- Libby (county seat)
- Troy

=== Towns ===
- Eureka
- Rexford

=== Census-designated places ===
- Bull Lake
- Fortine
- Happys Inn
- Indian Springs
- Midvale (former)
- Pioneer Junction
- Stryker
- Sylvanite
- Trego
- West Kootenai
- White Haven
- Yaak

=== Other unincorporated communities ===
- Dodge Summit
- Jennings
- Kootenai Falls
- Roosville
- Tobacco
- Yarnell

== Politics ==
For its first eighty years, Lincoln County was a Democratic-leaning area that would vote Republican only during large GOP landslides. Only four Republicans were to win the county in the seventeen Presidential elections between its inaugural election in 1912 and 1976. However, like many timber-dependent counties, it has become overwhelmingly Republican since that time. The last Democrat to carry Lincoln County was Michael Dukakis during the drought-influenced 1988 election. Since then, no Democrat has reached 35 percent of the county's vote.

United States presidential election results for Lincoln County, Montana
Year	Republican		Democratic		Third party(ies)	
Year	No.	%	No.	%	No.	%
1912	218	21.69%	346	34.43%	441	43.88%
1916	807	35.35%	1,186	51.95%	290	12.70%
1920	1,187	57.54%	683	33.11%	193	9.36%
1924	976	40.89%	374	15.67%	1,037	43.44%
1928	1,217	52.30%	1,067	45.85%	43	1.85%
1932	833	28.66%	1,867	64.25%	206	7.09%
1936	745	24.43%	2,117	69.41%	188	6.16%
1940	1,250	36.25%	2,150	62.35%	48	1.39%
1944	1,109	42.84%	1,445	55.81%	35	1.35%
1948	1,079	37.30%	1,689	58.38%	125	4.32%
1952	1,881	49.23%	1,907	49.91%	33	0.86%
1956	2,321	50.38%	2,286	49.62%	0	0.00%
1960	1,902	41.84%	2,623	57.70%	21	0.46%
1964	1,554	33.00%	3,140	66.68%	15	0.32%
1968	2,355	40.55%	2,677	46.10%	775	13.35%
1972	3,276	52.77%	2,402	38.69%	530	8.54%
1976	3,017	48.02%	3,146	50.07%	120	1.91%
1980	4,202	57.19%	2,422	32.96%	724	9.85%
1984	4,080	56.79%	2,959	41.19%	145	2.02%
1988	3,500	47.98%	3,601	49.37%	193	2.65%
1992	2,799	33.41%	2,765	33.00%	2,814	33.59%
1996	3,552	45.16%	2,705	34.39%	1,609	20.46%
2000	5,578	71.09%	1,629	20.76%	639	8.14%
2004	5,889	69.70%	2,320	27.46%	240	2.84%
2008	5,704	61.82%	3,025	32.78%	498	5.40%
2012	6,057	68.13%	2,552	28.71%	281	3.16%
2016	6,729	72.12%	2,041	21.88%	560	6.00%
2020	8,672	73.81%	2,835	24.13%	242	2.06%
2024	8,909	75.57%	2,615	22.18%	265	2.25%

== See also ==
- List of lakes in Lincoln County, Montana
- List of mountains in Lincoln County, Montana (A-L)
- List of mountains in Lincoln County, Montana (M-Z)
- National Register of Historic Places listings in Lincoln County MT
