= Kootenai National Forest =

National forest in Montana and Idaho, United States

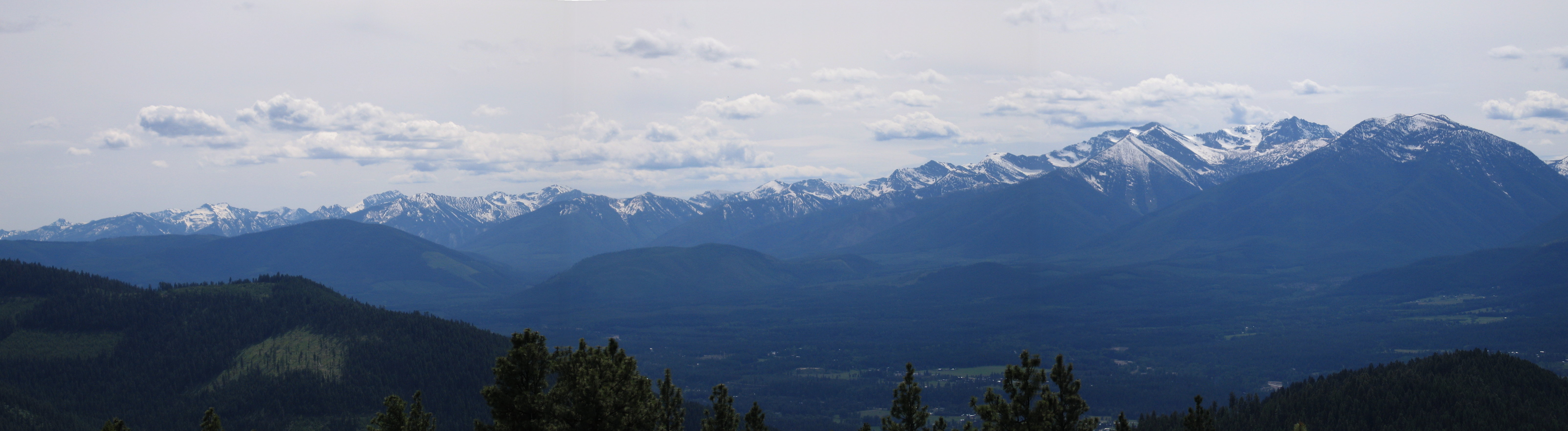
- Panorama of the southern Cabinet Mountains

- Location within the United States
- Location: Montana-Idaho, United States
- Nearest city: Libby, MT
- Coordinates: 48°11′N 115°28′W
- Area: 2,200,000 acres (8,900 km^{2})
- Established: 1907
- Governing body: U.S. Forest Service
- Website: Kootenai National Forest

The Kootenai National Forest is a national forest located in the far northwestern section of Montana and the northeasternmost lands in the Idaho panhandle in the United States, along the Canada–US border. Of the 2.2 million acres (8,900 km^{2}) administered by the forest, less than 3 percent is located in the state of Idaho. Forest headquarters are located in Libby, Montana. There are local ranger district offices in Eureka, Fortine, Libby, Trout Creek, and Troy, Montana. About 53 percent of the 94,272-acre (381.51 km^{2}) Cabinet Mountains Wilderness is located within the forest, with the balance lying in neighboring Kaniksu National Forest.

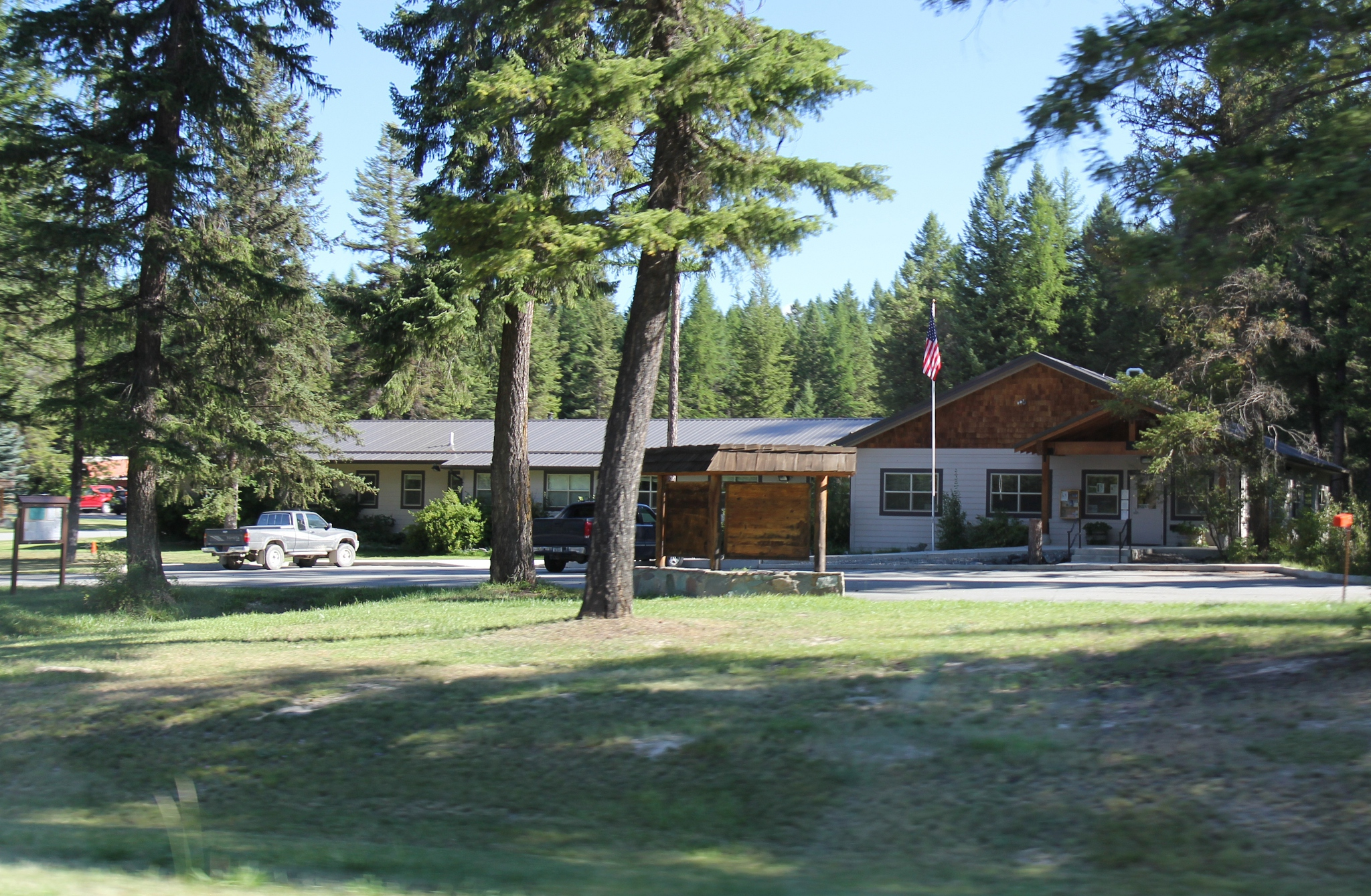
Ranger station at Murphy Lake

Snowshoe Peak in the Cabinet Mountains Wilderness, at 8,738 feet (2,663 m), is the highest peak within the forest. Mountain ranges included in the forest include the Whitefish, Purcell, Bitterroot, Salish, and Cabinet ranges.

The Pacific Northwest National Scenic Trail traverses the Forest. More than 90 miles (140 km) of the 1,200-mile (1,900 km) trail are within the Kootenai.

The Kootenai and the Clark Fork rivers are the major rivers and are fed by abundant rainfall that is more than double that amount found elsewhere in Montana. Three major hydroelectric dams exist in the Kootenai National Forest. Libby Dam on the Kootenai River creates a 90-mile (140 km)-long lake known as Lake Koocanusa (a play on Kootenai-Canada-United States of America), which extends into Canada. The shores of the lake are all forested with no private property easements. The lowest elevation in Montana is where the Kootenai River leaves the state, 1,832 feet (558 m) above sea level. Other rivers in the forest include the Yaak, Fisher, Tobacco and Vermillion, with water flowing from over 100 lakes.

The climate of the Kootenai has been described as "modified Pacific maritime" in character, meaning that compared to the remainder of Montana, this area's climate resembles that found along the Pacific coast. The character becomes "modified" by occasional intrusions of arctic air masses, more common elsewhere in Montana, which can bring winter temperatures down to −30 °F (−34 °C). Winters also feature heavy snowfalls in the mountains.

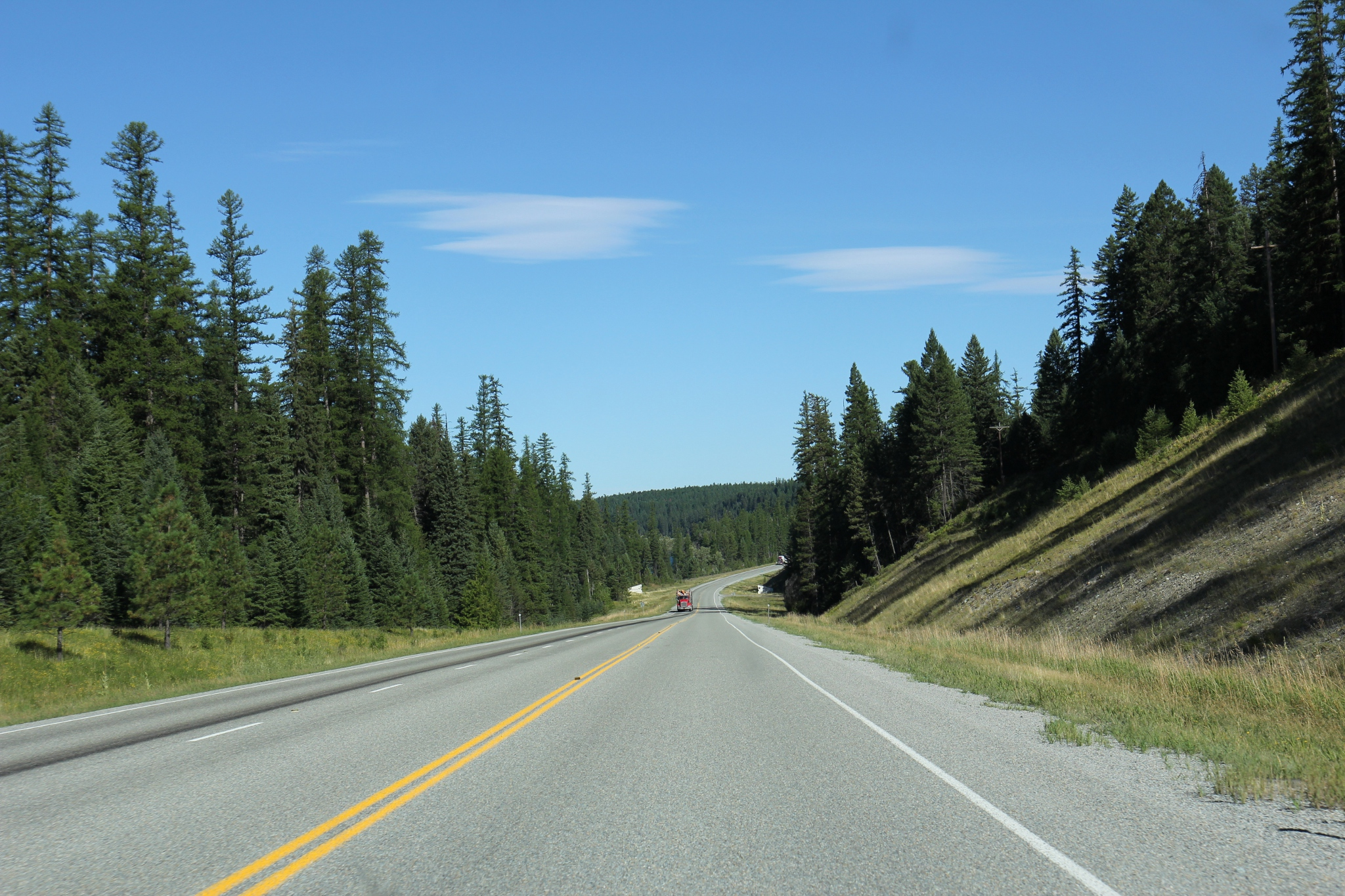
U.S. 93 through forest

Access into the forest is via U.S. Highway 2, U.S. Highway 93, and Montana State Highways 37, 56, 200, and 508.

The national forest is located overwhelmingly (almost 95 percent) in Lincoln County, Montana, but extends into neighboring counties. In descending order of forestland area, they are Flathead County in Montana, Bonner and Boundary counties in Idaho, and Sanders County in Montana. A coalition of recreationalists, business owners, timber mill operators and conservationists formed the Kootenai Forest Stakeholders Association to support active management to reduce wildfire risk, provide sustainable harvest, and improve forest health.

== See also ==
- Gibralter Fire
- List of forests in Montana
- List of national forests of the United States
