= Eureka, Montana =

- Town
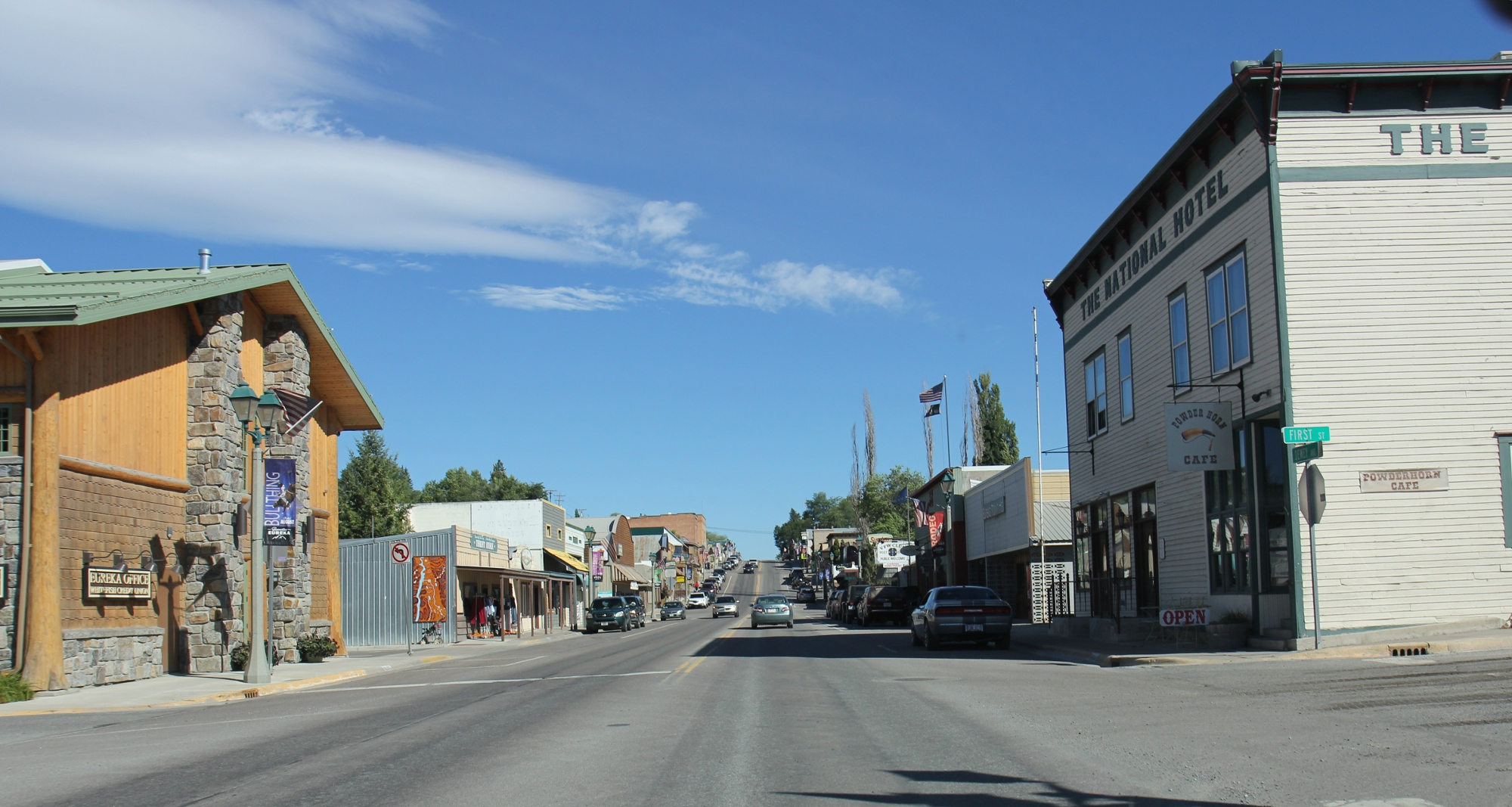
- Looking northwest at downtown Eureka on U.S. Route 93

- Location of Eureka, Montana
- Coordinates: 48°52′36″N 115°02′44″W
- Country: United States
- State: Montana
- County: Lincoln

Area
  - Total: 1.32 sq mi (3.43 km^{2})
  - Land: 1.32 sq mi (3.43 km^{2})
  - Water: 0 sq mi (0.00 km^{2})
- Elevation: 2,707 ft (825 m)

Population (2020)
  - Total: 1,380
  - Density: 1,040.6/sq mi (401.76/km^{2})
- Time zone: UTC-7 (Mountain (MST))
  - Summer (DST): UTC-6 (MDT)
- ZIP code: 59917
- Area code: 406
- FIPS code: 30-24850
- GNIS feature ID: 2412605
- Website: www.eureka-mt.gov

Eureka is a town in Lincoln County, Montana, United States, 9 miles (14 km) south of the Canada–US border. The population was 1,380 at the 2020 census.

== History ==
Eureka was founded in the early 1880s as settlers moved north from Missoula and south from Canada; it was originally known as Deweyville. One of the last areas to be developed in Montana in frontier times, logging was a major draw and source of income for decades. Eureka was once billed as the "Christmas Tree Capital of the World," with evergreens shipped to many urban points for holiday sales.

The Canadian fur-trapper and explorer David Thompson visited the area in the early 19th century during his searches for a route to the Pacific Ocean. Early explorers, finding Indians there growing a native strain of tobacco, named it the Tobacco Plains. In the late 1970s, Eurekans began a "Tobacco Valley Rendezvous" every year in April to commemorate Thompson's visit.

President Harry S. Truman gave a speech in Eureka on October 1, 1952, as part of a whistle-stop tour in support of Adlai Stevenson's ultimately unsuccessful presidential campaign.

Owens & Hurst Lumber mill closed in 2005.

== Geography ==
Eureka is located on the Tobacco River in an area known as the Tobacco Valley in the United States and Tobacco Plains in British Columbia.

It is approximately 66 miles (106 km) from Kalispell. The Tobacco River flows west through the southern part of town.

According to the United States Census Bureau, the town has a total area of 1.01 square miles (2.62 km^{2}), all land.

=== Climate ===
Eureka experiences a mild microclimate, notably warmer than the nearby cities of Kalispell and Whitefish, Montana as well as Invermere and Fernie, British Columbia. Summer afternoons are hot and sunny with low humidity, whilst winters are often cloudy but lack the extremely cold temperatures found nearby.

Climate data for Eureka, Montana (Eureka Ranger Station), 1991–2020 normals, extremes 1960–present
Month	Jan	Feb	Mar	Apr	May	Jun	Jul	Aug	Sep	Oct	Nov	Dec	Year
Record high °F (°C)	63 (17)	66 (19)	78 (26)	89 (32)	94 (34)	106 (41)	105 (41)	106 (41)	98 (37)	86 (30)	68 (20)	59 (15)	106 (41)
Mean maximum °F (°C)	48.0 (8.9)	51.1 (10.6)	63.3 (17.4)	74.7 (23.7)	84.7 (29.3)	90.6 (32.6)	97.3 (36.3)	97.1 (36.2)	88.6 (31.4)	73.4 (23.0)	55.9 (13.3)	46.4 (8.0)	99.1 (37.3)
Mean daily maximum °F (°C)	32.3 (0.2)	38.6 (3.7)	49.2 (9.6)	59.5 (15.3)	69.9 (21.1)	76.6 (24.8)	86.5 (30.3)	86.0 (30.0)	74.8 (23.8)	57.4 (14.1)	41.4 (5.2)	31.4 (−0.3)	58.6 (14.8)
Daily mean °F (°C)	25.8 (−3.4)	29.8 (−1.2)	38.3 (3.5)	46.8 (8.2)	55.9 (13.3)	62.5 (16.9)	69.6 (20.9)	68.6 (20.3)	59.4 (15.2)	46.3 (7.9)	34.4 (1.3)	26.1 (−3.3)	47.0 (8.3)
Mean daily minimum °F (°C)	19.3 (−7.1)	21.1 (−6.1)	27.5 (−2.5)	34.1 (1.2)	41.9 (5.5)	48.5 (9.2)	52.7 (11.5)	51.2 (10.7)	43.9 (6.6)	35.1 (1.7)	27.4 (−2.6)	20.8 (−6.2)	35.3 (1.8)
Mean minimum °F (°C)	−6.7 (−21.5)	0.1 (−17.7)	9.2 (−12.7)	21.0 (−6.1)	29.0 (−1.7)	37.0 (2.8)	42.3 (5.7)	39.0 (3.9)	30.3 (−0.9)	17.2 (−8.2)	7.9 (−13.4)	−1.0 (−18.3)	−15.6 (−26.4)
Record low °F (°C)	−35 (−37)	−30 (−34)	−23 (−31)	8 (−13)	22 (−6)	27 (−3)	30 (−1)	30 (−1)	18 (−8)	0 (−18)	−23 (−31)	−50 (−46)	−50 (−46)
Average precipitation inches (mm)	0.92 (23)	0.72 (18)	0.90 (23)	1.00 (25)	1.78 (45)	2.53 (64)	1.13 (29)	1.05 (27)	1.27 (32)	1.24 (31)	1.24 (31)	1.22 (31)	15 (379)
Average snowfall inches (cm)	8.5 (22)	5.9 (15)	3.7 (9.4)	1.0 (2.5)	0.2 (0.51)	0.0 (0.0)	0.0 (0.0)	0.0 (0.0)	0.0 (0.0)	0.6 (1.5)	5.0 (13)	10.2 (26)	35.1 (89.91)
Average extreme snow depth inches (cm)	7.5 (19)	5.0 (13)	3.7 (9.4)	0.7 (1.8)	0.0 (0.0)	0.0 (0.0)	0.0 (0.0)	0.0 (0.0)	0.0 (0.0)	0.2 (0.51)	3.5 (8.9)	7.1 (18)	10.8 (27)
Average precipitation days (≥ 0.01 in)	10.5	7.8	8.8	8.5	9.9	10.4	6.6	5.2	6.7	8.6	9.3	10.2	102.5
Average snowy days (≥ 0.1 in)	6.2	3.9	2.5	0.5	0.1	0.0	0.0	0.0	0.0	0.4	2.4	6.3	22.3
Source 1: NOAA
Source 2: National Weather Service

== Demographics ==
Historical population
Census	Pop.	Note	%±
1910	603		—
1920	1,082		79.4%
1930	860		−20.5%
1940	912		6.0%
1950	929		1.9%
1960	1,229		32.3%
1970	1,195		−2.8%
1980	1,119		−6.4%
1990	1,043		−6.8%
2000	1,017		−2.5%
2010	1,037		2.0%
2020	1,380		33.1%
U.S. Decennial Census

=== 2010 census ===
As of the census of 2010, there were 1,037 people, 442 households, and 261 families living in the town. The population density was 1,026.7 inhabitants per square mile (396.4/km^{2}). There were 495 housing units at an average density of 490.1 units per square mile (189.2 units/km^{2}). The racial makeup of the town was 94.8% White, 0.6% Native American, 0.4% Asian, 1.4% from other races, and 2.9% from two or more races. Hispanic or Latino of any race were 4.3% of the population.

There were 442 households, of which 28.5% had children under the age of 18 living with them, 43.0% were married couples living together, 10.4% had a female householder with no husband present, 5.7% had a male householder with no wife present, and 41.0% were non-families. 36.2% of all households were made up of individuals, and 18.7% had someone living alone who was 65 years of age or older. The average household size was 2.25 and the average family size was 2.92.

The median age in the town was 43.3 years. 23.9% of residents were under the age of 18; 6.3% were between the ages of 18 and 24; 21.7% were from 25 to 44; 25.2% were from 45 to 64; and 23.1% were 65 years of age or older. The gender makeup of the town was 45.4% male and 54.6% female.

=== 2000 census ===
As of the census of 2000, there were 1,017 people, 431 households, and 252 families living in the town. The population density was 1,008.6 inhabitants per square mile (389.4/km^{2}). There were 494 housing units at an average density of 489.9 units per square mile (189.2 units/km^{2}). The racial makeup of the town was 96.76% White, 1.28% Native American, 0.20% Asian, 0.59% from other races, and 1.18% from two or more races. 1.47% of the population were Hispanic or Latino of any race.

There were 431 households, out of which 30.2% had children under the age of 18 living with them, 43.9% were married couples living together, 11.1% had a female householder with no husband present, and 41.3% were non-families. 35.7% of all households were made up of individuals, and 14.6% had someone living alone who was 65 years of age or older. The average household size was 2.26 and the average family size was 2.93.

In the town, the population was spread out, with 24.5% under the age of 18, 7.8% from 18 to 24, 25.5% from 25 to 44, 24.1% from 45 to 64, and 18.2% who were 65 years of age or older. The median age was 40 years. For every 100 females there were 92.2 males. For every 100 females age 18 and over, there were 88.7 males.

The median income for a household in the town was $27,120, and the median income for a family was $30,268. Males had a median income of $31,731 versus $18,214 for females. The per capita income for the town was $12,619. About 19.5% of families and 22.9% of the population were below the poverty line, including 33.5% of those under age 18 and 6.4% of those age 65 or over.

== Arts and culture ==
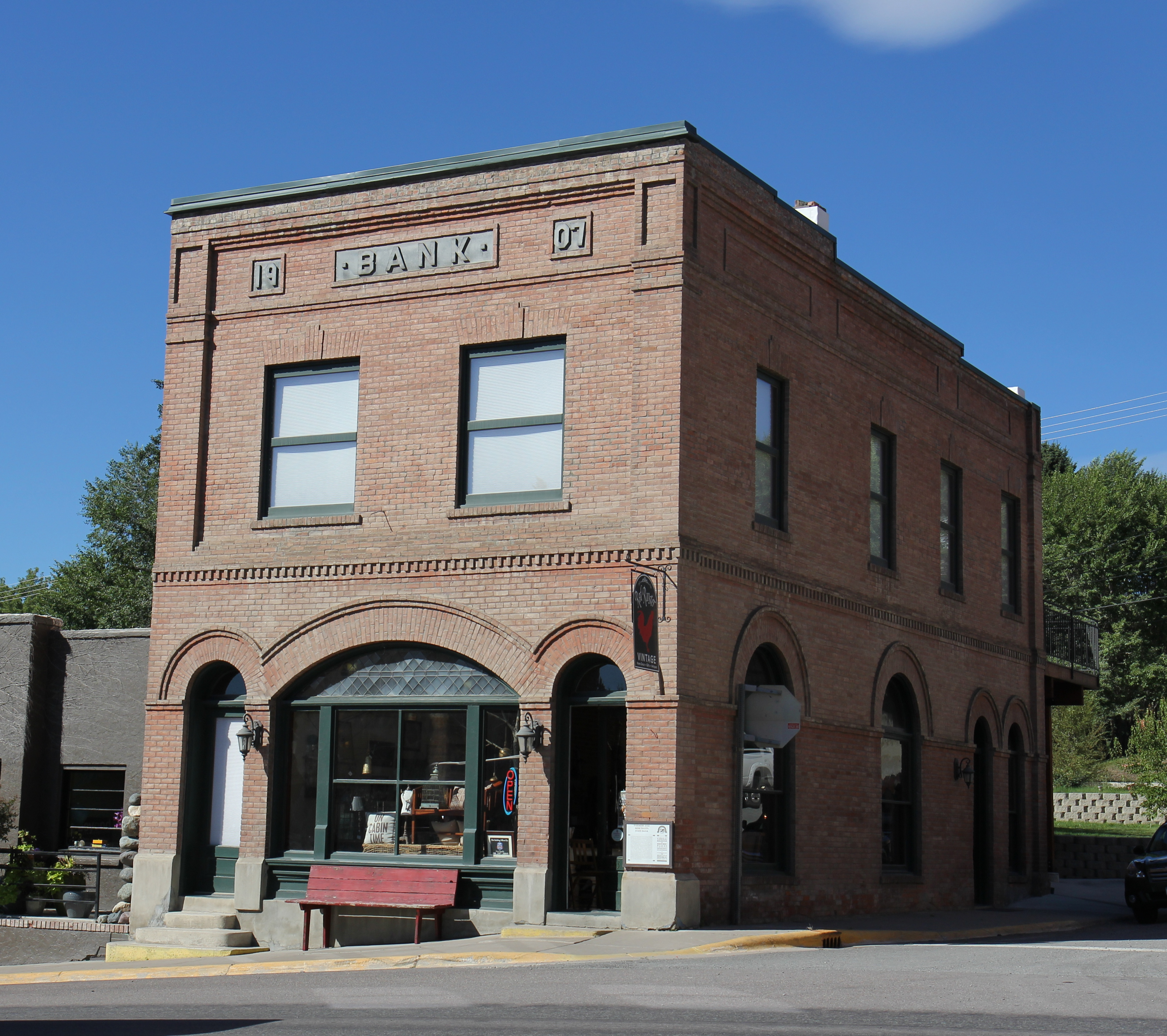
Farmers and Merchants State Bank

The area has many opportunities for outdoor activities. The Pacific Northwest Trail, a 1,200 mile hiking trail from the Continental Divide to the Pacific Ocean, passes through Eureka. Ten Lakes Scenic Area is located approximately 45 minutes from town. These 14,945 acres have been set aside for backcountry use. To the west is Lake Koocanusa, a large reservoir used for water recreation.

Every April Eureka has the large Rendezvous Days celebration. This fun event includes bed races and black powder events. Shakespeare in the Park performs every summer. Also in the summer is The Bull Thing, a Professional Bull Riders event. Eureka hosts the Lincoln County Fair which has carnival rides, rodeos, and local booths.

Eureka has two listings on the National Register of Historic Places: the Eureka Community Hall and the Farmers and Merchants State Bank. They also have The Historical Village. It is a collection of several historic buildings, all furnished with period artifacts.

The town has a public library, a branch of the Lincoln County Public Libraries.

== Government ==
Eureka has a Mayor-Council form of government. There are four council members and a mayor. In the 2025 elections Sonya Richardson defeated Kellen White for the mayor position. She replaced LeeAnn Schermerhorn, who did not run for re-election.

== Education ==
Eureka Public Schools educates students from kindergarten through 12th grade. They are known as the Lions. The elementary school, pre-kindergarten through 4th grade, had 237 students enrolled for the 2021–2022 school year. Middle school, 5th to 8th grade, had 238 students.

Lincoln County High School is a Class B high school, a designation which helps determine athletic competitions. For the 2021–2022 school year, 293 students were enrolled in the school.

== Media ==
The Tobacco Valley News is a weekly newspaper available either by print or e-edition.

Three radio stations are licensed in the town. KEUK is part of the Montana Public Radio network. KEUR-LP is a religious channel. KZXT is a local station airing an adult contemporary format

== Infrastructure ==
US Route 93 cuts through town from north to south. Montana Highway 37 ends about 1 mile (2 km) north of town.

Eureka Airport is a public use airport located 5 miles north of town. The nearest commercial airport is Glacier Park International Airport, 62 miles (100 km) south.

Logan Health has 3 medical clinics in Eureka.

== See also ==
- Empire Builder
- Eureka station
- Flathead Tunnel
