= 1988 United States presidential election in Montana =

- November 8, 1988
- Turnout: 75.0%

Nominee	George H. W. Bush	Michael Dukakis
Party	Republican	Democratic
Home state	Texas	Massachusetts
Running mate	Dan Quayle	Lloyd Bentsen
Electoral vote	4	0
Popular vote	190,412	168,936
Percentage	52.07%	46.20%

Bush
40–50%
50–60%
60–70%
70–80%
Dukakis
40–50%
50–60%
60–70%
70–80%
President before election
Ronald Reagan
Republican
Elected President
George H. W. Bush
Republican

The 1988 United States presidential election in Montana took place on November 8, 1988, and was part of the 1988 United States presidential election. Voters chose four representatives, or electors to the Electoral College, who voted for president and vice president. This was the last election until 2024 when Montana had four electoral votes: the continuing depopulation of the Great Plains would cause the state to revert to an at-large congressional district for 1992. Montana regained a second congressional district, and therefore a fourth electoral vote, in 2022.

Montana voted for the Republican nominee, Vice President George H. W. Bush, over the Democratic nominee, Massachusetts governor Michael Dukakis.

Bush won by a margin of 5.87%, much lower than usual in this typically solid Republican state, largely due to the persistent drought and Farm crisis on the Great Plains, a result making Montana 1.93% more Democratic than the national average. Since 1916 this is the solitary election when Blaine County, the most consistent bellwether county in the nation, has supported a losing presidential candidate; Bush is thus the only Republican to win the White House without carrying this county. It is also the last time Montana has voted more Democratic than the nation at-large and one of only two since 1956 (along with 1972), and the last occasion northwestern Lincoln County has supported a Democratic Presidential nominee. Thus, Iowa (with four counties), Texas (with three), and Montana (with one) are the only states containing counties that Dukakis (as of 2024) was the last Democrat to carry.

Bush became the first-ever Republican to win the White House without carrying Rosebud County, as well as the first to do so without carrying Lewis and Clark County since William Howard Taft in 1908, and the first to do so without carrying Missoula County since Calvin Coolidge in 1924. This is the last time that Montana has voted more Democratic than Maine.

== Results ==
1988 United States presidential election in Montana
Party	Candidate	Votes	Percentage	Electoral votes
Republican	George H. W. Bush	190,412	52.07%	4
Democratic	Michael Dukakis	168,936	46.20%	0
Libertarian	Ron Paul	5,047	1.38%	0
New Alliance	Lenora Fulani	1,279	0.35%	0
Totals		365,674	100.00%	4

=== Results by county ===
County	George H.W. Bush Republican		Michael Dukakis Democratic		Various candidates Other parties		Margin		Total votes cast
County	#	%	#	%	#	%	#	%	Total votes cast
Beaverhead	2,668	66.73%	1,274	31.87%	56	1.40%	1,394	34.86%	3,998
Big Horn	1,711	42.95%	2,233	56.05%	40	1.00%	-522	-13.10%	3,984
Blaine	1,402	48.15%	1,460	50.14%	50	1.72%	-58	-1.99%	2,912
Broadwater	1,054	62.63%	592	35.18%	37	2.20%	462	27.45%	1,683
Carbon	2,360	52.80%	2,039	45.62%	71	1.59%	321	7.18%	4,470
Carter	686	72.82%	242	25.69%	14	1.49%	444	47.13%	942
Cascade	15,946	49.64%	15,718	48.93%	460	1.43%	228	0.71%	32,124
Chouteau	1,980	61.51%	1,166	36.22%	73	2.27%	814	25.29%	3,219
Custer	3,007	55.05%	2,343	42.90%	112	2.05%	664	12.15%	5,462
Daniels	802	57.49%	571	40.93%	22	1.58%	231	16.56%	1,395
Dawson	2,658	54.40%	2,120	43.39%	108	2.21%	538	11.01%	4,886
Deer Lodge	1,168	26.51%	3,185	72.29%	53	1.20%	-2,017	-45.78%	4,406
Fallon	1,002	61.25%	612	37.41%	22	1.34%	390	23.84%	1,636
Fergus	3,948	64.55%	2,052	33.55%	116	1.90%	1,896	31.00%	6,116
Flathead	14,461	57.33%	10,202	40.44%	562	2.23%	4,259	16.89%	25,225
Gallatin	13,214	56.94%	9,527	41.06%	464	2.00%	3,687	15.88%	23,205
Garfield	631	74.15%	196	23.03%	24	2.82%	435	51.12%	851
Glacier	1,728	43.16%	2,151	53.72%	125	3.12%	-423	-10.56%	4,004
Golden Valley	335	61.69%	203	37.38%	5	0.92%	132	24.31%	543
Granite	789	59.50%	511	38.54%	26	1.96%	278	20.96%	1,326
Hill	3,467	44.50%	4,219	54.15%	105	1.35%	-752	-9.65%	7,791
Jefferson	2,007	52.31%	1,746	45.50%	84	2.19%	261	6.81%	3,837
Judith Basin	902	59.50%	590	38.92%	24	1.58%	312	20.58%	1,516
Lake	4,883	53.37%	4,109	44.91%	158	1.73%	774	8.46%	9,150
Lewis and Clark	10,946	46.91%	11,932	51.14%	456	1.95%	-986	-4.23%	23,334
Liberty	771	63.82%	418	34.60%	19	1.57%	353	29.22%	1,208
Lincoln	3,500	47.98%	3,601	49.37%	193	2.65%	-101	-1.39%	7,294
McCone	814	58.18%	567	40.53%	18	1.29%	247	17.65%	1,399
Madison	2,045	68.62%	878	29.46%	57	1.91%	1,167	39.16%	2,980
Meagher	656	65.01%	337	33.40%	16	1.59%	319	31.61%	1,009
Mineral	616	43.14%	789	55.25%	23	1.61%	-173	-12.11%	1,428
Missoula	15,965	44.76%	19,178	53.77%	526	1.47%	-3,213	-9.01%	35,669
Musselshell	1,280	58.08%	898	40.74%	26	1.18%	382	17.34%	2,204
Park	3,823	59.13%	2,526	39.07%	116	1.79%	1,297	20.06%	6,465
Petroleum	204	67.55%	91	30.13%	7	2.32%	113	37.42%	302
Phillips	1,462	60.26%	905	37.30%	59	2.43%	557	22.96%	2,426
Pondera	1,795	57.64%	1,245	39.98%	74	2.38%	550	17.66%	3,114
Powder River	815	66.15%	395	32.06%	22	1.79%	420	34.09%	1,232
Powell	1,574	56.31%	1,174	42.00%	47	1.68%	400	14.31%	2,795
Prairie	541	60.11%	343	38.11%	16	1.78%	198	22.00%	900
Ravalli	7,418	59.39%	4,763	38.13%	309	2.47%	2,655	21.26%	12,490
Richland	2,628	57.81%	1,824	40.12%	94	2.07%	804	17.69%	4,546
Roosevelt	1,957	47.52%	2,083	50.58%	78	1.89%	-126	-3.06%	4,118
Rosebud	1,822	48.05%	1,869	49.29%	101	2.66%	-47	-1.24%	3,792
Sanders	2,152	51.24%	1,959	46.64%	89	2.12%	193	4.60%	4,200
Sheridan	1,381	49.98%	1,354	49.00%	28	1.01%	27	0.98%	2,763
Silver Bow	5,043	30.22%	11,422	68.45%	222	1.33%	-6,379	-38.23%	16,687
Stillwater	1,920	56.82%	1,407	41.64%	52	1.54%	513	15.18%	3,379
Sweet Grass	1,242	71.67%	462	26.66%	29	1.67%	780	45.01%	1,733
Teton	1,876	57.83%	1,303	40.17%	65	2.00%	573	17.66%	3,244
Toole	1,505	57.14%	1,070	40.62%	59	2.24%	435	16.52%	2,634
Treasure	291	54.29%	231	43.10%	14	2.61%	60	11.19%	536
Valley	2,467	52.42%	2,163	45.96%	76	1.61%	304	6.46%	4,706
Wheatland	667	59.03%	443	39.20%	20	1.77%	224	19.83%	1,130
Wibaux	358	56.92%	258	41.02%	13	2.07%	100	15.90%	629
Yellowstone	28,069	55.42%	21,987	43.41%	591	1.17%	6,082	12.01%	50,647
Totals	190,412	52.07%	168,936	46.20%	6,326	1.73%	21,476	5.87%	365,674

==== Counties that flipped from Republican to Democratic ====
- Blaine
- Glacier
- Hill
- Lewis and Clark
- Lincoln
- Mineral
- Missoula
- Roosevelt
- Rosebud

==== By congressional district ====
Bush won both congressional districts, including one that elected a Democrat.

District	Bush	Dukakis	Representative
1st	50%	48%	Pat Williams
2nd	54%	44%	Ron Marlenee

== See also ==
- United States presidential elections in Montana
- Presidency of George H. W. Bush
