= 1960 United States presidential election in Montana =

- November 8, 1960

Nominee	Richard Nixon	John F. Kennedy
Party	Republican	Democratic
Home state	California	Massachusetts
Running mate	Henry Cabot Lodge Jr.	Lyndon B. Johnson
Electoral vote	4	0
Popular vote	141,841	134,891
Percentage	51.10%	48.60%
County results
Nixon
40–50%
50–60%
60–70%
Kennedy
50–60%
60–70%
70–80%
President before election
Dwight D. Eisenhower
Republican
Elected President
John F. Kennedy
Democratic

The 1960 United States presidential election in Montana took place on November 8, 1960, as part of the 1960 United States presidential election. Voters chose four representatives, or electors to the Electoral College, who voted for president and vice president.

Montana narrowly voted for the Republican nominee, Vice President Richard Nixon, over the Democratic nominee, Massachusetts Senator John F. Kennedy. Nixon won Montana by a slim margin of 2.50%. Kennedy thus became the first Democrat to win the White House without carrying Montana since Grover Cleveland in 1892, as well as the first ever Democrat to do so without carrying Carter, Liberty, Phillips, Richland, or Sanders Counties, the first to do so without carrying Fergus or Jefferson Counties since Cleveland in 1892, and the first to do so without carrying Custer, Missoula or Musselshell Counties since Woodrow Wilson in 1912. This is the first time since 1900 in which Montana would vote for the losing candidate in a presidential election, and only the second time a losing Republican carried the state. This would happen again in 1976, 1996, 2008, 2012, and 2020.

== Results ==
1960 United States presidential election in Montana
Party	Candidate	Votes	Percentage	Electoral votes
Republican	Richard Nixon	141,841	51.10%	4
Democratic	John F. Kennedy	134,891	48.60%	0
Prohibition	Rutherford Decker	456	0.16%	0
Militant Workers	Farrell Dobbs	391	0.14%	0
Totals		277,579	100.00%	4

=== Results by county ===
County	Richard Nixon Republican		John F. Kennedy Democratic		Various candidates Other parties		Margin		Total votes cast
County	#	%	#	%	#	%	#	%	Total votes cast
Beaverhead	1,731	56.88%	1,307	42.95%	5	0.16%	424	13.93%	3,043
Big Horn	1,724	53.47%	1,497	46.43%	3	0.09%	227	7.04%	3,224
Blaine	1,290	44.85%	1,569	54.55%	17	0.59%	-279	-9.70%	2,876
Broadwater	680	51.87%	631	48.13%	0	0.00%	49	3.74%	1,311
Carbon	2,050	51.75%	1,903	48.04%	8	0.20%	147	3.71%	3,961
Carter	688	64.00%	383	35.63%	4	0.37%	305	28.37%	1,075
Cascade	11,928	45.72%	14,117	54.11%	45	0.17%	-2,189	-8.39%	26,090
Chouteau	1,672	49.34%	1,708	50.40%	9	0.27%	-36	-1.06%	3,389
Custer	2,943	55.00%	2,393	44.72%	15	0.28%	550	10.28%	5,351
Daniels	763	44.26%	960	55.68%	1	0.06%	-197	-11.42%	1,724
Dawson	2,460	53.69%	2,108	46.01%	14	0.31%	352	7.68%	4,582
Deer Lodge	2,188	29.79%	5,149	70.11%	7	0.10%	-2,961	-40.32%	7,344
Fallon	918	60.55%	597	39.38%	1	0.07%	321	21.17%	1,516
Fergus	3,294	52.24%	2,999	47.56%	13	0.21%	295	4.68%	6,306
Flathead	7,554	52.95%	6,689	46.88%	24	0.17%	865	6.07%	14,267
Gallatin	6,870	64.49%	3,761	35.31%	21	0.20%	3,109	29.18%	10,652
Garfield	515	58.52%	363	41.25%	2	0.23%	152	17.27%	880
Glacier	1,775	43.95%	2,260	55.95%	4	0.10%	-485	-12.00%	4,039
Golden Valley	362	56.65%	277	43.35%	0	0.00%	85	13.30%	639
Granite	722	54.57%	592	44.75%	9	0.68%	130	9.82%	1,323
Hill	3,163	45.73%	3,741	54.09%	12	0.17%	-578	-8.36%	6,916
Jefferson	817	51.38%	769	48.36%	4	0.25%	48	3.02%	1,590
Judith Basin	721	46.10%	842	53.84%	1	0.06%	-121	-7.74%	1,564
Lake	3,240	56.75%	2,462	43.12%	7	0.12%	778	13.63%	5,709
Lewis and Clark	7,260	54.65%	6,008	45.22%	17	0.13%	1,252	9.43%	13,285
Liberty	597	54.27%	501	45.55%	2	0.18%	96	8.72%	1,100
Lincoln	1,902	41.84%	2,623	57.70%	21	0.46%	-721	-15.86%	4,546
McCone	743	49.04%	764	50.43%	8	0.53%	-21	-1.39%	1,515
Madison	1,456	58.97%	1,010	40.91%	3	0.12%	446	18.06%	2,469
Meagher	613	58.49%	431	41.13%	4	0.38%	182	17.36%	1,048
Mineral	549	44.27%	686	55.32%	5	0.40%	-137	-11.05%	1,240
Missoula	10,396	53.76%	8,876	45.90%	65	0.34%	1,520	7.86%	19,337
Musselshell	1,107	50.09%	1,100	49.77%	3	0.14%	7	0.32%	2,210
Park	3,329	59.44%	2,249	40.15%	23	0.41%	1,080	19.29%	5,601
Petroleum	255	53.57%	221	46.43%	0	0.00%	34	7.14%	476
Phillips	1,457	49.81%	1,455	49.74%	13	0.44%	2	0.07%	2,925
Pondera	1,452	46.76%	1,653	53.24%	0	0.00%	-201	-6.48%	3,105
Powder River	665	60.18%	438	39.64%	2	0.18%	227	20.54%	1,105
Powell	1,497	49.49%	1,522	50.31%	6	0.20%	-25	-0.82%	3,025
Prairie	649	65.75%	338	34.25%	0	0.00%	311	31.50%	987
Ravalli	3,121	56.46%	2,381	43.07%	26	0.47%	740	13.39%	5,528
Richland	2,395	56.10%	1,863	43.64%	11	0.26%	532	12.46%	4,269
Roosevelt	1,876	45.40%	2,227	53.90%	29	0.70%	-351	-8.50%	4,132
Rosebud	1,386	57.77%	1,002	41.77%	11	0.46%	384	16.00%	2,399
Sanders	1,497	50.17%	1,469	49.23%	18	0.60%	28	0.94%	2,984
Sheridan	1,196	43.43%	1,549	56.25%	9	0.33%	-353	-12.82%	2,754
Silver Bow	7,290	34.40%	13,754	64.91%	146	0.69%	-6,464	-30.51%	21,190
Stillwater	1,455	58.41%	1,036	41.59%	0	0.00%	419	16.82%	2,491
Sweet Grass	1,096	67.78%	521	32.22%	0	0.00%	575	35.56%	1,617
Teton	1,623	49.54%	1,648	50.31%	5	0.15%	-25	-0.77%	3,276
Toole	1,577	47.10%	1,767	52.78%	4	0.12%	-190	-5.68%	3,348
Treasure	300	52.63%	270	47.37%	0	0.00%	30	5.26%	570
Valley	2,387	44.65%	2,953	55.24%	6	0.11%	-566	-10.59%	5,346
Wheatland	793	52.24%	724	47.69%	1	0.07%	69	4.55%	1,518
Wibaux	387	48.01%	419	51.99%	0	0.00%	-32	-3.98%	806
Yellowstone	19,467	60.82%	12,356	38.61%	183	0.57%	7,111	22.21%	32,006
Totals	141,841	51.10%	134,891	48.60%	847	0.31%	6,950	2.50%	277,579

==== Counties that flipped from Republican to Democratic ====
- Blaine
- Cascade
- Daniels
- Glacier
- Hill
- Lincoln
- Mineral
- Pondera
- Powell
- Silver Bow
- Teton
- Toole
- Wibaux

== See also ==
- United States presidential elections in Montana
