= 2000 United States presidential election in Montana =

- November 7, 2000
- Turnout: 59.9% (▼10.7 pp)

Nominee	George W. Bush	Al Gore	Ralph Nader
Party	Republican	Democratic	Green
Home state	Texas	Tennessee	Connecticut
Running mate	Dick Cheney	Joe Lieberman	Winona LaDuke
Electoral vote	3	0	0
Popular vote	240,178	137,126	24,437
Percentage	58.44%	33.37%	5.95%
County results
Bush
40–50%
50–60%
60–70%
70–80%
80–90%
Gore
50–60%
President before election
Bill Clinton
Democratic
Elected President
George W. Bush
Republican

The 2000 United States presidential election in Montana took place on November 7, 2000, and was part of the 2000 United States presidential election. Voters chose three electors to the Electoral College, which voted for president and vice president.

Montana was won by Governor George W. Bush. Bush won most of the counties in the state, and only obtained less than 40% in three counties. Bush won the highest populated county, Yellowstone County with 59% of the vote. Gore won a total of five counties, and did the best in Deer Lodge County.

Ralph Nader, the Green party nominee, performed very well here, getting 5.95% of the vote statewide. He did very well in the western part of the state, getting over 5% of the vote in most of the counties in the region. His best performance by far was in Missoula County, where he got over 15% of the vote, which was the only county Nader cracked double digits. Nader's performance in Montana made it his fifth strongest state after Alaska, Vermont, Massachusetts and Rhode Island.

As of the 2024 presidential election, this is the last election in which Missoula County voted for the Republican candidate. Al Gore's 33.4% of the vote was the worst performance for a Democrat in Montana since Jimmy Carter in 1980, and no Democrat has fallen under that number since. Gore's margin of loss is the largest for a Democrat in Montana since James M. Cox in 1920.

== General election ==
=== Polling ===
Poll source	Date(s)	Sample size	Margin of error	George W. Bush (R)	Al Gore (D)	Ralph Nader (G)	Other / undecided (Note: Calculated by taking the difference of 100% and all other listed candidates combined. For polls that do not report a figure for Nader, this includes his support.)
Mason-Dixon Polling & Strategy	October 24, 2000	628	—	49%	37%	5%	9%
Montana State University Billings Mountain States Poll	October 21, 2000	403 (Note: Average of multiple versions or turnout models listed in the poll.)	—	53%	32%	5%	10%
Rasmussen Reports	October 19, 2000	968	—	56%	28%	—	16%

=== Results ===
2000 United States presidential election in Montana
Party	Candidate	Votes	Percentage	Electoral votes
Republican	George W. Bush	240,178	58.44%	3
Democratic	Al Gore	137,126	33.37%	0
Green	Ralph Nader	24,437	5.95%	0
Reform	Patrick Buchanan	5,697	1.39%	0
Libertarian	Harry Browne	1,718	0.42%	0
Constitution	Howard Phillips	1,155	0.28%	0
Natural Law	John Hagelin	675	0.16%	0
Totals		410,986	100.00%	3
Voter turnout (Voting age/registered)				61%/59%

==== By county ====
County	George W. Bush Republican		Al Gore Democratic		Various candidates Other parties		Margin		Total
County	#	%	#	%	#	%	#	%	Total
Beaverhead	3,113	74.19%	799	19.04%	284	6.77%	2,314	55.15%	4,196
Big Horn	1,651	39.68%	2,345	56.36%	165	3.97%	-694	-16.68%	4,161
Blaine	1,410	51.11%	1,246	45.16%	103	3.73%	164	5.95%	2,759
Broadwater	1,488	71.75%	462	22.28%	124	5.98%	1,026	49.47%	2,074
Carbon	3,008	62.81%	1,434	29.94%	347	7.25%	1,574	32.87%	4,789
Carter	573	88.84%	53	8.22%	19	2.95%	520	80.62%	645
Cascade	18,164	54.52%	13,137	39.43%	2,016	6.05%	5,027	15.09%	33,317
Chouteau	2,039	70.68%	686	23.78%	160	5.55%	1,353	46.90%	2,885
Custer	3,156	64.34%	1,501	30.60%	248	5.06%	1,655	33.74%	4,905
Daniels	750	67.57%	303	27.30%	57	5.14%	447	40.27%	1,110
Dawson	2,723	63.76%	1,364	31.94%	184	4.31%	1,359	31.82%	4,271
Deer Lodge	1,493	32.93%	2,672	58.93%	369	8.14%	-1,179	-26.00%	4,534
Fallon	1,061	77.50%	256	18.70%	52	3.80%	805	58.80%	1,369
Fergus	4,353	72.62%	1,352	22.56%	289	4.82%	3,001	50.06%	5,994
Flathead	22,519	66.55%	8,329	24.61%	2,991	8.84%	14,190	41.94%	33,839
Gallatin	18,833	58.78%	10,009	31.24%	3,198	9.98%	8,824	27.54%	32,040
Garfield	651	87.50%	61	8.20%	32	4.30%	590	79.30%	744
Glacier	1,709	41.44%	2,211	53.61%	204	4.95%	-502	-12.17%	4,124
Golden Valley	405	76.27%	88	16.57%	38	7.16%	317	59.70%	531
Granite	1,181	74.28%	295	18.55%	114	7.17%	886	55.73%	1,590
Hill	3,392	51.72%	2,760	42.09%	406	6.19%	632	9.63%	6,558
Jefferson	3,308	64.07%	1,513	29.30%	342	6.62%	1,795	34.77%	5,163
Judith Basin	1,057	75.82%	278	19.94%	59	4.23%	779	55.88%	1,394
Lake	6,441	56.26%	3,884	33.93%	1,123	9.81%	2,557	22.33%	11,448
Lewis and Clark	15,091	55.34%	9,982	36.61%	2,196	8.05%	5,109	18.73%	27,269
Liberty	752	72.03%	243	23.28%	49	4.69%	509	48.75%	1,044
Lincoln	5,578	71.09%	1,629	20.76%	639	8.14%	3,949	50.33%	7,846
Madison	2,656	72.65%	758	20.73%	242	6.62%	1,898	51.92%	3,656
McCone	827	72.42%	267	23.38%	48	4.20%	560	49.04%	1,142
Meagher	698	74.65%	176	18.82%	61	6.52%	522	55.83%	935
Mineral	1,078	65.77%	382	23.31%	179	10.92%	696	42.46%	1,639
Missoula	21,474	46.11%	17,241	37.02%	7,861	16.88%	4,233	9.09%	46,576
Musselshell	1,582	71.68%	512	23.20%	113	5.12%	1,070	48.48%	2,207
Park	4,523	61.07%	2,154	29.08%	729	9.84%	2,369	31.99%	7,406
Petroleum	254	83.01%	36	11.76%	16	5.23%	218	71.25%	306
Phillips	1,727	77.51%	423	18.99%	78	3.50%	1,304	58.52%	2,228
Pondera	1,948	67.27%	792	27.35%	156	5.39%	1,156	39.92%	2,896
Powder River	860	85.32%	115	11.41%	33	3.27%	745	73.91%	1,008
Powell	1,971	69.60%	638	22.53%	223	7.87%	1,333	47.07%	2,832
Prairie	541	72.52%	164	21.98%	41	5.50%	377	50.54%	746
Ravalli	11,241	65.21%	4,451	25.82%	1,546	8.97%	6,790	39.39%	17,238
Richland	2,858	70.87%	1,018	25.24%	157	3.89%	1,840	45.63%	4,033
Roosevelt	1,605	42.09%	2,059	54.00%	149	3.91%	-454	-11.91%	3,813
Rosebud	1,826	53.35%	1,394	40.72%	203	5.93%	432	12.63%	3,423
Sanders	3,144	66.60%	1,165	24.68%	412	8.73%	1,979	41.92%	4,721
Sheridan	1,176	59.85%	702	35.73%	87	4.43%	474	24.12%	1,965
Silver Bow	6,299	37.71%	8,967	53.68%	1,437	8.60%	-2,628	-15.97%	16,703
Stillwater	2,765	70.57%	925	23.61%	228	5.82%	1,840	46.96%	3,918
Sweet Grass	1,450	78.55%	305	16.52%	91	4.93%	1,145	62.03%	1,846
Teton	2,294	69.22%	847	25.56%	173	5.22%	1,447	43.66%	3,314
Toole	1,639	68.92%	630	26.49%	109	4.58%	1,009	42.43%	2,378
Treasure	344	71.82%	106	22.13%	29	6.05%	238	49.69%	479
Valley	2,500	63.08%	1,273	32.12%	190	4.79%	1,227	30.96%	3,963
Wheatland	708	70.87%	243	24.32%	48	4.80%	465	46.55%	999
Wibaux	369	71.24%	121	23.36%	28	5.41%	248	47.88%	518
Yellowstone	33,922	59.00%	20,370	35.43%	3,207	5.58%	13,552	23.57%	57,499
Totals	240,178	58.44%	137,126	33.36%	33,693	8.20%	103,052	25.08%	410,997

Counties that flipped from Democratic to Republican

- Blaine (largest city: Chinook)
- Cascade (largest city: Great Falls)
- Dawson (largest city: Glendive)
- Hill (largest city: Havre)
- Mineral (largest city: Superior)
- Missoula (largest city: Missoula)
- Rosebud (largest city: Colstrip)
- Sheridan (largest city: Plentywood)

==== By congressional district ====
Due to the state's low population, only one congressional district is allocated. This district is an at-large district (it covers the entire state), and thus is equivalent to the statewide election results.

District	Bush	Gore	Representative
At-large	58.4%	33.4%	Denny Rehberg

== Electors ==
The electors of each state and the District of Columbia met on December 18, 2000 to cast their votes for president and vice president. The following were the members of the Electoral College from the state, each of whom was pledged to and voted for George W. Bush: Thelma Baker, Jack Galt, and Tillie Pierce.

== See also ==
- United States presidential elections in Montana
- Presidency of George W. Bush
