= 1956 United States presidential election in Montana =

- November 6, 1956

Nominee	Dwight D. Eisenhower	Adlai Stevenson
Party	Republican	Democratic
Home state	Pennsylvania (Note: Although he was born in Texas and grew up in Kansas before his military career, at the time of the 1952 election Eisenhower was president of Columbia University and was, officially, a resident of New York. During his first term as president, he moved his private residence to Gettysburg, Pennsylvania, and officially changed his residency to Pennsylvania.)	Illinois
Running mate	Richard Nixon	Estes Kefauver
Electoral vote	4	0
Popular vote	154,933	116,238
Percentage	57.13%	42.87%
County results
Eisenhower
50–60%
60–70%
70–80%
Stevenson
50–60%
60–70%
President before election
Dwight D. Eisenhower
Republican
Elected President
Dwight D. Eisenhower
Republican

The 1956 United States presidential election in Montana took place on November 6, 1956, as part of the 1956 United States presidential election. Voters chose four representatives, or electors to the Electoral College, who voted for president and vice president.

Montana strongly voted for the Republican nominee, President Dwight D. Eisenhower, over the Democratic nominee, former Illinois Governor Adlai Stevenson. Eisenhower won Montana by 14.26%; however, owing to a five-year drought in the High Plains that resulted in a considerable protest vote for Stevenson, he did not do as well as he had four years earlier.

However, his strong Catholic appeal meant that Eisenhower gained substantially in the heavily Irish mining counties of the west. His 48.61% in Deer Lodge County is the best by a Republican there since Warren G. Harding in 1920, and as of the 2024 presidential election, this is last election in which Silver Bow County voted for a Republican presidential candidate. In addition to that, this is the last election in which neighboring Deer Lodge and Silver Bow counties voted for different candidates, the two normally being Democratic strongholds. Eisenhower became the first Republican to carry Montana more than once.

== Results ==
1956 United States presidential election in Montana
Party	Candidate	Votes	Percentage	Electoral votes
Republican	Dwight D. Eisenhower (incumbent)	154,933	57.13%	4
Democratic	Adlai Stevenson	116,238	42.87%	0
Totals		271,171	100.00%	4

=== Results by county ===
County	Dwight D. Eisenhower Republican		Adlai Stevenson Democratic		Margin		Total votes cast
County	#	%	#	%	#	%	Total votes cast
Beaverhead	1,955	65.52%	1,029	34.48%	926	31.04%	2,984
Big Horn	1,739	56.44%	1,342	43.56%	397	12.88%	3,081
Blaine	1,460	50.38%	1,438	49.62%	22	0.76%	2,898
Broadwater	869	65.93%	449	34.07%	420	31.86%	1,318
Carbon	2,345	56.30%	1,820	43.70%	525	12.60%	4,165
Carter	698	61.55%	436	38.45%	262	23.10%	1,134
Cascade	12,455	52.88%	11,098	47.12%	1,357	5.76%	23,553
Chouteau	1,721	48.96%	1,794	51.04%	-73	-2.08%	3,515
Custer	3,240	58.30%	2,317	41.70%	923	16.60%	5,557
Daniels	982	50.93%	946	49.07%	36	1.86%	1,928
Dawson	2,463	56.08%	1,929	43.92%	534	12.16%	4,392
Deer Lodge	3,551	48.36%	3,792	51.64%	-241	-3.28%	7,343
Fallon	967	61.24%	612	38.76%	355	22.48%	1,579
Fergus	3,771	57.77%	2,757	42.23%	1,014	15.54%	6,528
Flathead	8,088	57.40%	6,003	42.60%	2,085	14.80%	14,091
Gallatin	6,680	67.20%	3,260	32.80%	3,420	34.40%	9,940
Garfield	558	56.82%	424	43.18%	134	13.64%	982
Glacier	2,054	52.99%	1,822	47.01%	232	5.98%	3,876
Golden Valley	383	59.94%	256	40.06%	127	19.88%	639
Granite	896	62.70%	533	37.30%	363	25.40%	1,429
Hill	3,415	53.24%	2,999	46.76%	416	6.48%	6,414
Jefferson	1,049	61.38%	660	38.62%	389	22.76%	1,709
Judith Basin	789	48.20%	848	51.80%	-59	-3.60%	1,637
Lake	3,363	59.88%	2,253	40.12%	1,110	19.76%	5,616
Lewis and Clark	7,959	64.41%	4,397	35.59%	3,562	28.82%	12,356
Liberty	601	55.19%	488	44.81%	113	10.38%	1,089
Lincoln	2,321	50.38%	2,286	49.62%	35	0.76%	4,607
Madison	1,662	64.24%	925	35.76%	737	28.48%	2,587
McCone	752	45.83%	889	54.17%	-137	-8.34%	1,641
Meagher	712	66.73%	355	33.27%	357	33.46%	1,067
Mineral	606	52.33%	552	47.67%	54	4.66%	1,158
Missoula	10,627	61.12%	6,760	38.88%	3,867	22.24%	17,387
Musselshell	1,165	51.10%	1,115	48.90%	50	2.20%	2,280
Park	3,733	63.44%	2,151	36.56%	1,582	26.88%	5,884
Petroleum	258	55.72%	205	44.28%	53	11.44%	463
Phillips	1,605	52.94%	1,427	47.06%	178	5.88%	3,032
Pondera	1,651	53.45%	1,438	46.55%	213	6.90%	3,089
Powder River	700	60.55%	456	39.45%	244	21.10%	1,156
Powell	1,683	58.09%	1,214	41.91%	469	16.18%	2,897
Prairie	637	61.25%	403	38.75%	234	22.50%	1,040
Ravalli	3,437	61.40%	2,161	38.60%	1,276	22.80%	5,598
Richland	2,366	55.67%	1,884	44.33%	482	11.34%	4,250
Roosevelt	1,985	47.37%	2,205	52.63%	-220	-5.26%	4,190
Rosebud	1,516	63.01%	890	36.99%	626	26.02%	2,406
Sanders	1,649	52.05%	1,519	47.95%	130	4.10%	3,168
Sheridan	1,153	38.31%	1,857	61.69%	-704	-23.38%	3,010
Silver Bow	11,619	50.31%	11,475	49.69%	144	0.62%	23,094
Stillwater	1,540	60.32%	1,013	39.68%	527	20.64%	2,553
Sweet Grass	1,129	71.28%	455	28.72%	674	42.56%	1,584
Teton	1,728	51.58%	1,622	48.42%	106	3.16%	3,350
Toole	1,927	56.89%	1,460	43.11%	467	13.78%	3,387
Treasure	337	57.22%	252	42.78%	85	14.44%	589
Valley	2,357	48.42%	2,511	51.58%	-154	-3.16%	4868
Wheatland	932	61.72%	578	38.28%	354	23.44%	1510
Wibaux	431	52.50%	390	47.50%	41	5.00%	821
Yellowstone	18,664	64.91%	10,088	35.09%	8,576	29.82%	28,752
Totals	154,933	57.13%	116,238	42.87%	38,695	14.26%	271,171

==== Counties that flipped from Republican to Democratic ====
- Chouteau
- Judith Basin
- McCone
- Roosevelt
- Valley

==== Counties that flipped from Democratic to Republican ====
- Lincoln
- Silver Bow

== See also ==
- United States presidential elections in Montana
