= 1968 United States presidential election in Montana =

- November 5, 1968

Nominee	Richard Nixon	Hubert Humphrey	George Wallace
Party	Republican	Democratic	American Independent
Home state	New York (Note: Although he was born in California and he served as a U.S. senator from California, in 1968 Richard Nixon's official state of residence was New York, because he moved there to practice law after his defeat in the 1962 California gubernatorial election. During his first term as president, Nixon re-established his residency in California. Consequently, most reliable reference books list Nixon’s home state as New York in the 1968 election and his home state as California in the 1972 (and 1960) election.)	Minnesota	Alabama
Running mate	Spiro Agnew	Edmund Muskie	Marvin Griffin
Electoral vote	4	0	0
Popular vote	138,835	114,117	20,015
Percentage	50.60%	41.59%	7.29%
County results
Nixon
40–50%
50–60%
60–70%
70–80%
Humphrey
40–50%
50–60%
60–70%
President before election
Lyndon B. Johnson
Democratic
Elected President
Richard Nixon
Republican

The 1968 United States presidential election in Montana took place on November 5, 1968, and was part of the 1968 United States presidential election. Voters chose four representatives, or electors to the Electoral College, who voted for president and vice president.

Montana voted for the Republican nominee, former Vice President Richard Nixon, over the Democratic nominee, Vice President Hubert Humphrey. Nixon won Montana by a large margin of 9.01%. A third-party candidate, former Alabama Governor George Wallace, won 7.29% of the vote, or 20,015 raw votes, the highest percentage for a 3rd party candidate in the state since Robert M. La Follette in 1924, and would not be surpassed or equaled until Independent John B. Anderson in 1980, who went on to receive 8.05% of the vote, or 29,281 raw votes. Wallace was most successful in the mountain regions, which have a tradition of hostility to Washington D.C. interference, and also to Northeastern big business. Wallace possessed little appeal in heavily German and Scandinavian Plains regions.

Nixon's victory was the first of six consecutive Republican victories in the state, as Montana would not vote for a Democratic candidate again until Bill Clinton in 1992. However, Montana would return to being a Republican leaning state afterwards.

As of the 2024 presidential election, this remains the last occasion the Democratic presidential nominee has carried Jefferson County, where Humphrey won a 22-vote plurality.

== Results ==
1968 United States presidential election in Montana
Party	Candidate	Votes	Percentage	Electoral votes
Republican	Richard Nixon	138,835	50.60%	4
Democratic	Hubert Humphrey	114,117	41.59%	0
American	George Wallace	20,015	7.29%	0
Prohibition	E. Harold Munn	510	0.19%	0
New Reform	No Candidate	470	0.17%	0
Militant Workers	Fred Halstead	457	0.17%	0
Totals		274,404	100.00%	4

=== Results by county ===
County	Richard Nixon Republican		Hubert Humphrey Democratic		George Wallace American		Various candidates Other parties		Margin		Total votes cast
County	#	%	#	%	#	%	#	%	#	%	Total votes cast
Beaverhead	1,896	61.04%	853	27.46%	357	11.49%	0	0.00%	1,043	33.58%	3,106
Big Horn	1,789	53.87%	1,319	39.72%	209	6.29%	4	0.12%	470	14.15%	3,321
Blaine	1,291	48.63%	1,198	45.12%	165	6.21%	1	0.04%	93	3.51%	2,655
Broadwater	671	54.29%	439	35.52%	125	10.11%	1	0.08%	232	18.77%	1,236
Carbon	1,972	54.98%	1,353	37.72%	258	7.19%	4	0.11%	619	17.26%	3,587
Carter	624	62.21%	269	26.82%	110	10.97%	0	0.00%	355	35.39%	1,003
Cascade	11,588	43.23%	13,507	50.39%	1,539	5.74%	169	0.63%	-1,919	-7.16%	26,803
Chouteau	1,695	53.66%	1,216	38.49%	247	7.82%	1	0.03%	479	15.17%	3,159
Custer	2,831	58.06%	1,760	36.10%	275	5.64%	10	0.21%	1,071	21.96%	4,876
Daniels	826	52.15%	688	43.43%	69	4.36%	1	0.06%	138	8.72%	1,584
Dawson	2,650	58.01%	1,695	37.11%	220	4.82%	3	0.07%	955	20.90%	4,568
Deer Lodge	1,554	25.58%	4,208	69.28%	308	5.07%	4	0.07%	-2,654	-43.70%	6,074
Fallon	990	63.26%	477	30.48%	97	6.20%	1	0.06%	513	32.78%	1,565
Fergus	3,367	55.59%	2,070	34.18%	616	10.17%	4	0.07%	1,297	21.41%	6,057
Flathead	7,215	51.54%	5,253	37.52%	1,524	10.89%	8	0.06%	1,962	14.02%	14,000
Gallatin	7,433	62.06%	3,818	31.88%	706	5.89%	21	0.18%	3,615	30.18%	11,978
Garfield	542	64.22%	190	22.51%	112	13.27%	0	0.00%	352	41.71%	844
Glacier	1,643	44.76%	1,723	46.94%	295	8.04%	10	0.27%	-80	-2.18%	3,671
Golden Valley	332	60.04%	194	35.08%	26	4.70%	1	0.18%	138	24.96%	553
Granite	626	49.56%	502	39.75%	135	10.69%	0	0.00%	124	9.81%	1,263
Hill	2,970	44.53%	3,386	50.77%	305	4.57%	8	0.12%	-416	-6.24%	6,669
Jefferson	798	45.06%	820	46.30%	152	8.58%	1	0.06%	-22	-1.24%	1,771
Judith Basin	804	53.03%	606	39.97%	106	6.99%	0	0.00%	198	13.06%	1,516
Lake	3,358	55.98%	1,956	32.61%	679	11.32%	6	0.10%	1,402	23.37%	5,999
Lewis and Clark	7,979	56.53%	5,379	38.11%	723	5.12%	34	0.24%	2,600	18.42%	14,115
Liberty	670	58.57%	390	34.09%	83	7.26%	1	0.09%	280	24.48%	1,144
Lincoln	2,355	40.55%	2,677	46.10%	765	13.17%	10	0.17%	-322	-5.55%	5,807
McCone	733	52.17%	589	41.92%	82	5.84%	1	0.07%	144	10.25%	1,405
Madison	1,289	56.39%	734	32.11%	261	11.42%	2	0.09%	555	24.28%	2,286
Meagher	543	62.92%	218	25.26%	102	11.82%	0	0.00%	325	37.66%	863
Mineral	483	41.32%	576	49.27%	108	9.24%	2	0.17%	-93	-7.95%	1,169
Missoula	9,745	48.02%	8,398	41.39%	1,638	8.07%	511	2.52%	1,347	6.63%	20,292
Musselshell	953	51.15%	795	42.67%	111	5.96%	4	0.21%	158	8.48%	1,863
Park	3,063	57.36%	1,815	33.99%	460	8.61%	2	0.04%	1,248	23.37%	5,340
Petroleum	211	62.99%	98	29.25%	26	7.76%	0	0.00%	113	33.74%	335
Phillips	1,353	51.41%	1,100	41.79%	177	6.72%	2	0.08%	253	9.62%	2,632
Pondera	1,530	52.98%	1,149	39.79%	205	7.10%	4	0.14%	381	13.19%	2,888
Powder River	699	64.96%	258	23.98%	118	10.97%	1	0.09%	441	40.98%	1,076
Powell	1,301	47.50%	1,206	44.03%	231	8.43%	1	0.04%	95	3.47%	2,739
Prairie	635	67.77%	270	28.82%	30	3.20%	2	0.21%	365	38.95%	937
Ravalli	3,183	53.25%	2,080	34.80%	709	11.86%	5	0.08%	1,103	18.45%	5,977
Richland	2,381	59.29%	1,399	34.84%	228	5.68%	8	0.20%	982	24.45%	4,016
Roosevelt	1,947	50.12%	1,771	45.59%	162	4.17%	5	0.13%	176	4.53%	3,885
Rosebud	1,190	56.42%	711	33.71%	204	9.67%	4	0.19%	479	22.71%	2,109
Sanders	1,459	48.70%	1,242	41.46%	292	9.75%	3	0.10%	217	7.24%	2,996
Sheridan	1,180	45.81%	1,275	49.50%	115	4.46%	6	0.23%	-95	-3.69%	2,576
Silver Bow	5,488	27.98%	12,626	64.36%	1,120	5.71%	383	1.95%	-7,138	-36.38%	19,617
Stillwater	1,347	61.20%	676	30.71%	177	8.04%	1	0.05%	671	30.49%	2,201
Sweet Grass	1,043	70.00%	336	22.55%	110	7.38%	1	0.07%	707	47.45%	1,490
Teton	1,697	54.58%	1,228	39.50%	179	5.76%	5	0.16%	469	15.08%	3,109
Toole	1,407	51.96%	1,048	38.70%	249	9.19%	4	0.15%	359	13.26%	2,708
Treasure	298	56.55%	188	35.67%	41	7.78%	0	0.00%	110	20.88%	527
Valley	2,290	49.44%	1,926	41.58%	393	8.48%	23	0.50%	364	7.86%	4,632
Wheatland	673	51.77%	525	40.38%	101	7.77%	1	0.08%	148	11.39%	1,300
Wibaux	347	52.98%	252	38.47%	56	8.55%	0	0.00%	95	14.51%	655
Yellowstone	19,898	58.77%	11,682	34.50%	2,124	6.27%	153	0.45%	8,216	24.27%	33,857
Totals	138,835	50.60%	114,117	41.59%	20,015	7.29%	1,437	0.52%	24,718	9.01%	274,404

==== Counties that flipped from Democratic to Republican ====
- Big Horn
- Blaine
- Carbon
- Chouteau
- Custer
- Daniels
- Dawson
- Fergus
- Flathead
- Golden Valley
- Granite
- Judith Basin
- Lake
- Liberty
- Lewis and Clark
- McCone
- Missoula
- Musselshell
- Park
- Petroleum
- Phillips
- Pondera
- Powell
- Ravalli
- Richland
- Roosevelt
- Rosebud
- Sanders
- Teton
- Toole
- Treasure
- Valley
- Wheatland
- Wibaux
- Yellowstone

== See also ==
- United States presidential elections in Montana
