= 1928 United States presidential election in Montana =

- November 6, 1928

Nominee	Herbert Hoover	Al Smith
Party	Republican	Democratic
Home state	California	New York
Running mate	Charles Curtis	Joseph Taylor Robinson
Electoral vote	4	0
Popular vote	113,300	78,578
Percentage	58.37%	40.48%
County results
Hoover
50–60%
60–70%
70–80%
Smith
50–60%
President before election
Calvin Coolidge
Republican
Elected President
Herbert Hoover
Republican

The 1928 United States presidential election in Montana took place on November 6, 1928, as part of the 1928 United States presidential election. Voters chose four representatives, or electors to the Electoral College, who voted for president and vice president.

Montana strongly voted for the Republican nominee, former U.S. Secretary of Commerce Herbert Hoover, over the Democratic nominee, New York Governor Al Smith. Hoover won Montana by a landslide margin of 17.89%. The Republicans at this time were associated with the booming economy of the 1920s while Smith was associated with the corruption of Tammany Hall. This was the last time until 1952 that a Republican would carry Montana.

== Results ==
1928 United States presidential election in Montana
Party	Candidate	Votes	Percentage	Electoral votes
Republican	Herbert Hoover	113,300	58.37%	4
Democratic	Al Smith	78,578	40.48%	0
Socialist	Norman Thomas	1,667	0.86%	0
Communist	William Foster	563	0.29%	0
Totals		194,120	100.00%	4

=== Results by county ===
County	Herbert Clark Hoover Republican		Alfred Emmanual Smith Democratic		Various candidates Other parties		Margin		Total votes cast
County	#	%	#	%	#	%	#	%	Total votes cast
Beaverhead	1,906	62.21%	1,144	37.34%	14	0.46%	762	24.87%	3,064
Big Horn	1,274	55.46%	1,017	44.28%	6	0.26%	257	11.19%	2,297
Blaine	1,537	56.63%	1,160	42.74%	17	0.63%	377	13.89%	2,714
Broadwater	743	52.51%	663	46.86%	9	0.64%	80	5.65%	1,415
Carbon	2,514	58.10%	1,674	38.69%	139	3.21%	840	19.41%	4,327
Carter	763	64.01%	420	35.23%	9	0.76%	343	28.78%	1,192
Cascade	8,183	55.08%	6,540	44.02%	133	0.90%	1,643	11.06%	14,856
Chouteau	1,837	59.14%	1,232	39.67%	37	1.19%	605	19.48%	3,106
Custer	2,503	64.08%	1,386	35.48%	17	0.44%	1,117	28.60%	3,906
Daniels	936	53.92%	780	44.93%	20	1.15%	156	8.99%	1,736
Dawson	2,207	67.16%	1,065	32.41%	14	0.43%	1,142	34.75%	3,286
Deer Lodge	2,695	45.67%	3,184	53.96%	22	0.37%	-489	-8.29%	5,901
Fallon	1,036	69.07%	454	30.27%	10	0.67%	582	38.80%	1,500
Fergus	4,109	60.09%	2,667	39.00%	62	0.91%	1,442	21.09%	6,838
Flathead	4,098	66.61%	1,972	32.05%	82	1.33%	2,126	34.56%	6,152
Gallatin	3,861	61.11%	2,423	38.35%	34	0.54%	1,438	22.76%	6,318
Garfield	1,176	69.67%	499	29.56%	13	0.77%	677	40.11%	1,688
Glacier	847	46.39%	976	53.45%	3	0.16%	-129	-7.06%	1,826
Golden Valley	625	63.91%	346	35.38%	7	0.72%	279	28.53%	978
Granite	849	62.15%	509	37.26%	8	0.59%	340	24.89%	1,366
Hill	2,336	53.37%	2,022	46.20%	19	0.43%	314	7.17%	4,377
Jefferson	1,013	56.97%	751	42.24%	14	0.79%	262	14.74%	1,778
Judith Basin	1,342	56.77%	978	41.37%	44	1.86%	364	15.40%	2,364
Lake	1,876	59.42%	1,256	39.78%	25	0.79%	620	19.64%	3,157
Lewis and Clark	4,441	57.35%	3,278	42.33%	25	0.32%	1,163	15.02%	7,744
Liberty	446	56.74%	332	42.24%	8	1.02%	114	14.50%	786
Lincoln	1,217	52.30%	1,067	45.85%	43	1.85%	150	6.45%	2,327
Madison	946	61.87%	554	36.23%	29	1.90%	392	25.64%	1,529
McCone	1,785	68.36%	812	31.10%	14	0.54%	973	37.27%	2,611
Meagher	714	67.94%	335	31.87%	2	0.19%	379	36.06%	1,051
Mineral	443	53.25%	370	44.47%	19	2.28%	73	8.77%	832
Missoula	5,056	59.71%	3,291	38.87%	120	1.42%	1,765	20.85%	8,467
Musselshell	1,608	50.55%	1,444	45.39%	129	4.06%	164	5.16%	3,181
Park	3,095	68.84%	1,338	29.76%	63	1.40%	1,757	39.08%	4,496
Petroleum	586	60.85%	372	38.63%	5	0.52%	214	22.22%	963
Phillips	1,671	59.09%	1,135	40.13%	22	0.78%	536	18.95%	2,828
Pondera	1,324	57.99%	944	41.35%	15	0.66%	380	16.64%	2,283
Powder River	780	65.05%	410	34.20%	9	0.75%	370	30.86%	1,199
Powell	1,568	59.80%	1,031	39.32%	23	0.88%	537	20.48%	2,622
Prairie	968	70.20%	405	29.37%	6	0.44%	563	40.83%	1,379
Ravalli	2,551	68.50%	1,112	29.86%	61	1.64%	1,439	38.64%	3,724
Richland	1,648	63.53%	917	35.35%	29	1.12%	731	28.18%	2,594
Roosevelt	1,630	55.27%	1,296	43.95%	23	0.78%	334	11.33%	2,949
Rosebud	1,519	59.38%	1,025	40.07%	14	0.55%	494	19.31%	2,558
Sanders	1,142	53.67%	873	41.02%	113	5.31%	269	12.64%	2,128
Sheridan	1,624	54.66%	1,190	40.05%	157	5.28%	434	14.61%	2,971
Silver Bow	9,456	44.81%	11,228	53.21%	419	1.99%	-1,772	-8.40%	21,103
Stillwater	1,687	70.06%	711	29.53%	10	0.42%	976	40.53%	2,408
Sweet Grass	1,163	72.46%	435	27.10%	7	0.44%	728	45.36%	1,605
Teton	1,263	60.58%	804	38.56%	18	0.86%	459	22.01%	2,085
Toole	1,325	54.71%	1,076	44.43%	21	0.87%	249	10.28%	2,422
Treasure	354	65.43%	186	34.38%	1	0.18%	168	31.05%	541
Valley	2,330	63.85%	1,294	35.46%	25	0.69%	1,036	28.39%	3,649
Wheatland	1,207	68.35%	554	31.37%	5	0.28%	653	36.98%	1,766
Wibaux	583	56.27%	448	43.24%	5	0.48%	135	13.03%	1,036
Yellowstone	6,904	68.08%	3,205	31.60%	32	0.32%	3,699	36.48%	10,141
Totals	113,300	58.37%	78,590	40.49%	2,230	1.15%	34,710	17.88%	194,120

== See also ==
- United States presidential elections in Montana
