= Golden Valley County, Montana =

County in Montana, United States

- County
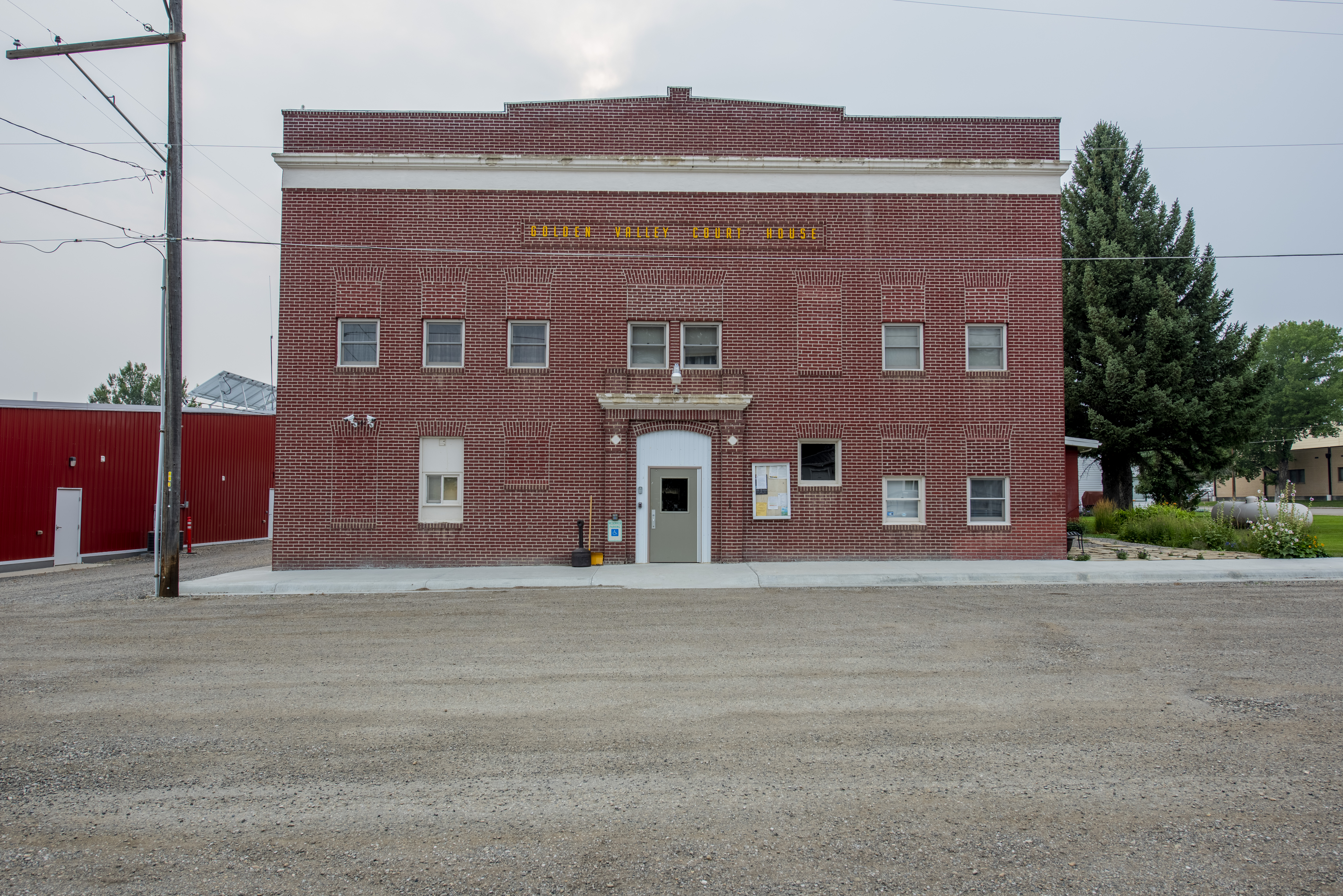
- Golden Valley County Courthouse in Ryegate, Montana

- Location within the U.S. state of Montana
- Coordinates: 46°23′N 109°10′W
- Country: United States
- State: Montana
- Founded: March 8, 1920
- Seat: Ryegate
- Largest town: Ryegate

Area
  - Total: 1,176 sq mi (3,050 km^{2})
  - Land: 1,175 sq mi (3,040 km^{2})
  - Water: 1.0 sq mi (2.6 km^{2}) 0.08%

Population (2020)
  - Total: 823
  - Estimate (2025): 844 ▲
  - Density: 0.7/sq mi (0.27/km^{2})
- Time zone: UTC−7 (Mountain)
  - Summer (DST): UTC−6 (MDT)
- Congressional district: 2nd
- Website: www.goldenvalleycountymt.org
- Montana county number 53

Golden Valley County is a county located in the U.S. state of Montana. As of the 2020 census, the population was 823, making it the third-least populous county in Montana. Its county seat is Ryegate.

== Geography ==
Golden Valley County, Montana, was created on October 4, 1920, from parts of Musselshell and Sweet Grass counties. The county was formed to accommodate the need for smaller, more manageable county governments in the area. According to the United States Census Bureau, the county has a total area of 1,176 square miles (3,050 km^{2}), of which 1,175 square miles (3,040 km^{2}) is land and 1.0 square mile (2.6 km^{2}) (0.08%) is water. It is Montana's fifth-smallest county by area.

=== Major highways ===
- U.S. Highway 12
- Montana Highway 3

=== Adjacent counties ===
- Fergus County – north
- Musselshell County – east
- Yellowstone County – southeast
- Stillwater County – south
- Sweet Grass County – southwest
- Wheatland County – west

=== National protected area ===
- Lewis and Clark National Forest (part)

== Politics ==
The county has usually favored Republican candidates. The 2016 Democratic candidate only received 71 county votes, the lowest ever for a major party in the county in a presidential election. The last Democrat to win there was Lyndon Johnson in his 1964 landslide victory.

United States presidential election results for Golden Valley County, Montana
Year	Republican		Democratic		Third party(ies)	
Year	No.	%	No.	%	No.	%
1920	1,185	72.57%	381	23.33%	67	4.10%
1924	422	37.88%	118	10.59%	574	51.53%
1928	625	63.91%	346	35.38%	7	0.72%
1932	423	46.38%	469	51.43%	20	2.19%
1936	331	40.32%	474	57.73%	16	1.95%
1940	402	52.96%	351	46.25%	6	0.79%
1944	395	59.67%	266	40.18%	1	0.15%
1948	352	53.09%	295	44.49%	16	2.41%
1952	471	70.40%	198	29.60%	0	0.00%
1956	383	59.94%	256	40.06%	0	0.00%
1960	362	56.65%	277	43.35%	0	0.00%
1964	252	41.72%	352	58.28%	0	0.00%
1968	332	60.04%	194	35.08%	27	4.88%
1972	359	64.92%	170	30.74%	24	4.34%
1976	302	53.08%	255	44.82%	12	2.11%
1980	362	65.11%	155	27.88%	39	7.01%
1984	384	64.00%	211	35.17%	5	0.83%
1988	335	61.69%	203	37.38%	5	0.92%
1992	192	38.71%	142	28.63%	162	32.66%
1996	284	58.20%	128	26.23%	76	15.57%
2000	405	76.27%	88	16.57%	38	7.16%
2004	396	75.86%	119	22.80%	7	1.34%
2008	343	69.72%	124	25.20%	25	5.08%
2012	351	73.28%	110	22.96%	18	3.76%
2016	365	77.00%	71	14.98%	38	8.02%
2020	414	82.31%	78	15.51%	11	2.19%
2024	440	85.44%	67	13.01%	8	1.55%

== Demographics ==
Historical population
Census	Pop.	Note	%±
1930	2,126		—
1940	1,607		−24.4%
1950	1,337		−16.8%
1960	1,203		−10.0%
1970	931		−22.6%
1980	1,026		10.2%
1990	912		−11.1%
2000	1,042		14.3%
2010	884		−15.2%
2020	823		−6.9%
2025 (est.)	844	▲	2.6%
U.S. Decennial Census:

=== 2020 census ===
As of the 2020 census, the county had a population of 823. Of the residents, 19.7% were under the age of 18 and 28.3% were 65 years of age or older; the median age was 53.1 years. For every 100 females there were 106.3 males, and for every 100 females age 18 and over there were 102.1 males. 0.0% of residents lived in urban areas and 100.0% lived in rural areas.

The racial makeup of the county was 88.0% White, 1.2% Black or African American, 0.5% American Indian and Alaska Native, 0.0% Asian, 2.3% from some other race, and 7.5% from two or more races. Hispanic or Latino residents of any race comprised 4.3% of the population.

There were 372 households in the county, of which 24.7% had children under the age of 18 living with them and 22.0% had a female householder with no spouse or partner present. About 28.5% of all households were made up of individuals and 14.5% had someone living alone who was 65 years of age or older.

There were 474 housing units, of which 21.5% were vacant. Among occupied housing units, 78.2% were owner-occupied and 21.8% were renter-occupied. The homeowner vacancy rate was 4.5% and the rental vacancy rate was 0.0%.

=== 2010 census ===
As of the 2010 census, there were 884 people, 363 households, and 239 families residing in the county. The population density was 0.8 inhabitants per square mile (0.31/km^{2}). There were 476 housing units at an average density of 0.4 per square mile (0.15/km^{2}). The racial makeup of the county was 94.0% white, 1.0% American Indian, 0.7% Asian, 2.1% from other races, and 2.1% from two or more races. Those of Hispanic or Latino origin made up 3.5% of the population. In terms of ancestry, 38.9% were German, 19.5% were English, 18.4% were Irish, 10.1% were Polish, 9.0% were American, 7.3% were Danish, 6.4% were Dutch, and 6.2% were Norwegian.

Of the 363 households, 20.7% had children under the age of 18 living with them, 55.4% were married couples living together, 5.2% had a female householder with no husband present, 34.2% were non-families, and 29.5% of all households were made up of individuals. The average household size was 2.19 and the average family size was 2.68. The median age was 48.8 years.

The median income for a household in the county was $35,726 and the median income for a family was $48,750. Males had a median income of $33,750 versus $27,938 for females. The per capita income for the county was $19,319. About 3.4% of families and 10.9% of the population were below the poverty line, including 21.7% of those under age 18 and 5.8% of those age 65 or over.

== Communities ==
=== Towns ===
- Lavina
- Ryegate (county seat)

=== Census-designated place ===
- Golden Valley Colony

=== Unincorporated communities ===
- Barber
- Belmont
- Franklin
- Lavina

== See also ==
- List of lakes in Golden Valley County, Montana
- List of mountains in Golden Valley County, Montana
- National Register of Historic Places listings in Golden Valley County, Montana
