= Golden Valley Colony, Montana =

- Census-designated place
- Location within Montana Location within the United States
- Coordinates: 46°15′33″N 109°16′24″W
- Country: United States
- State: Montana
- County: Golden Valley

Area
  - Total: 0.21 sq mi (0.54 km^{2})
  - Land: 0.21 sq mi (0.54 km^{2})
  - Water: 0 sq mi (0.00 km^{2})
- Elevation: 3,776 ft (1,151 m)

Population (2020)
  - Total: 4
  - Density: 19.3/sq mi (7.44/km^{2})
- Time zone: UTC-7 (Mountain (MST))
  - Summer (DST): UTC-6 (MDT)
- ZIP Code: 59074 (Ryegate)
- Area code: 406
- FIPS code: 30-31991
- GNIS feature ID: 2804294

Golden Valley Colony is a Hutterite community and census-designated place (CDP) in Golden Valley County, Montana, United States. As of the 2020 census, Golden Valley Colony had a population of 4. It is in the southwest part of the county, 3.5 miles (5.6 km) south of Ryegate and U.S. Route 12.

Golden Valley Colony was first listed as a CDP prior to the 2020 census.

== Demographics ==
Historical population
Census	Pop.	Note	%±
2020	4		—
U.S. Decennial Census
