= 1896 United States presidential election in Montana =

- November 3, 1896

Nominee	William Jennings Bryan	William McKinley
Party	Democratic	Republican
Alliance	Populist; Silver Republican
Home state	Nebraska	Ohio
Running mate	Arthur Sewall (Democratic, Silver Republican); Thomas E. Watson (Populist)	Garret Hobart
Electoral vote	3	0
Popular vote	42,628	10,509
Percentage	79.93%	19.71%
County results
Bryan
50–60%
60–70%
70–80%
80–90%
90–100%
McKinley
50–60%
60–70%
President before election
Grover Cleveland
Democratic
Elected President
William McKinley
Republican

The 1896 United States presidential election in Montana took place on November 3, 1896, as part of the 1896 United States presidential election. Voters chose three representatives, or electors to the Electoral College, who voted for president and vice president.

Montana overwhelmingly voted for the Democratic nominee, former U.S. Representative from Nebraska William Jennings Bryan over the Republican nominee, former governor of Ohio William McKinley. Bryan won the state by a landslide margin of 60.22 percentage points. To date this is the best performance ever by a presidential candidate in Montana.

Bryan's support for many Populist goals resulted in him being nominated by both the Democratic Party and the People's Party (Populists), though with different running mates. One electoral vote from Montana was cast for the Populist Bryan-Watson ticket with Thomas E. Watson as vice-president and two votes were cast for the Bryan-Sewall ticket.

Bryan would later beat McKinley in the state again four years later but would lose the state to William Howard Taft in 1908. This is one of two elections where the Republican candidate won without the state, the other being in 1900. McKinley is the only Republican to win the White House without carrying Yellowstone County.

== Results ==
General Election Results
Party	Pledged to	Elector	Votes
Fusion	William Jennings Bryan	Martin Maginnis	42,537
Fusion	William Jennings Bryan	Henry L. Frank	42,369
Fusion	William Jennings Bryan	Daniel Brown	42,328
Republican Party	William McKinley	Henry Knippenberg	10,494
Republican Party	William McKinley	Joseph H. Vivian	10,402
Republican Party	William McKinley	Frank H. Nash	10,374
Prohibition Party	Joshua Levering	Wilder Nutting	186
Prohibition Party	Joshua Levering	William A. Allen	178
Prohibition Party	Joshua Levering	William W. Wylie	173
Votes cast (Note: Based on totals for highest elector on each ticket)			53,217

=== Results by county ===
County	William Jennings Bryan Democratic		William McKinley Republican		Joshua Levering Prohibitionist		Margin		Total votes cast
County	#	%	#	%	#	%	#	%	Total votes cast
Beaverhead	1,246	88.56%	154	10.95%	7	0.50%	1,092	77.61%	1,407
Carbon	739	66.94%	365	33.06%	0	0.00%	374	33.88%	1,104
Cascade	2,920	75.10%	953	24.51%	15	0.39%	1,967	50.59%	3,888
Chouteau	701	52.67%	624	46.88%	6	0.45%	77	5.79%	1,331
Custer	676	48.15%	723	51.50%	5	0.36%	-47	-3.35%	1,404
Dawson	177	31.33%	385	68.14%	3	0.53%	-208	-36.81%	565
Deer Lodge	4,916	91.55%	446	8.31%	8	0.15%	4,470	83.24%	5,370
Fergus	834	53.39%	725	46.41%	3	0.19%	109	6.98%	1,562
Flathead	1,360	76.45%	413	23.22%	6	0.34%	947	53.23%	1,779
Gallatin	1,649	78.23%	423	20.07%	36	1.71%	1,226	58.16%	2,108
Granite	1,746	96.25%	61	3.36%	7	0.39%	1,685	92.89%	1,814
Jefferson	2,185	93.42%	153	6.54%	1	0.04%	2,032	86.87%	2,339
Lewis and Clark	4,007	78.82%	1,057	20.79%	20	0.39%	2,950	58.03%	5,084
Madison	1,633	83.40%	315	16.09%	10	0.51%	1,318	67.31%	1,958
Meagher	1,305	79.62%	333	20.32%	1	0.06%	972	59.30%	1,639
Missoula	2,259	85.89%	365	13.88%	6	0.23%	1,894	72.02%	2,630
Park	1,252	78.69%	328	20.62%	11	0.69%	924	58.08%	1,591
Ravalli	1,542	87.91%	207	11.80%	5	0.29%	1,335	76.11%	1,754
Silver Bow	9,992	88.46%	1,275	11.29%	29	0.26%	8,717	77.17%	11,296
Sweet Grass	298	50.42%	292	49.41%	1	0.17%	6	1.02%	591
Teton	321	52.20%	293	47.64%	1	0.16%	28	4.55%	615
Valley	204	53.83%	175	46.17%	0	0.00%	29	7.65%	379
Yellowstone	575	56.99%	429	42.52%	5	0.50%	146	14.47%	1,009
Totals	42,537	79.93%	10,494	19.72%	186	0.35%	32,043	60.21%	53,217

== See also ==
- United States presidential elections in Montana
