= Treasure County, Montana =

County in Montana, United States

- County
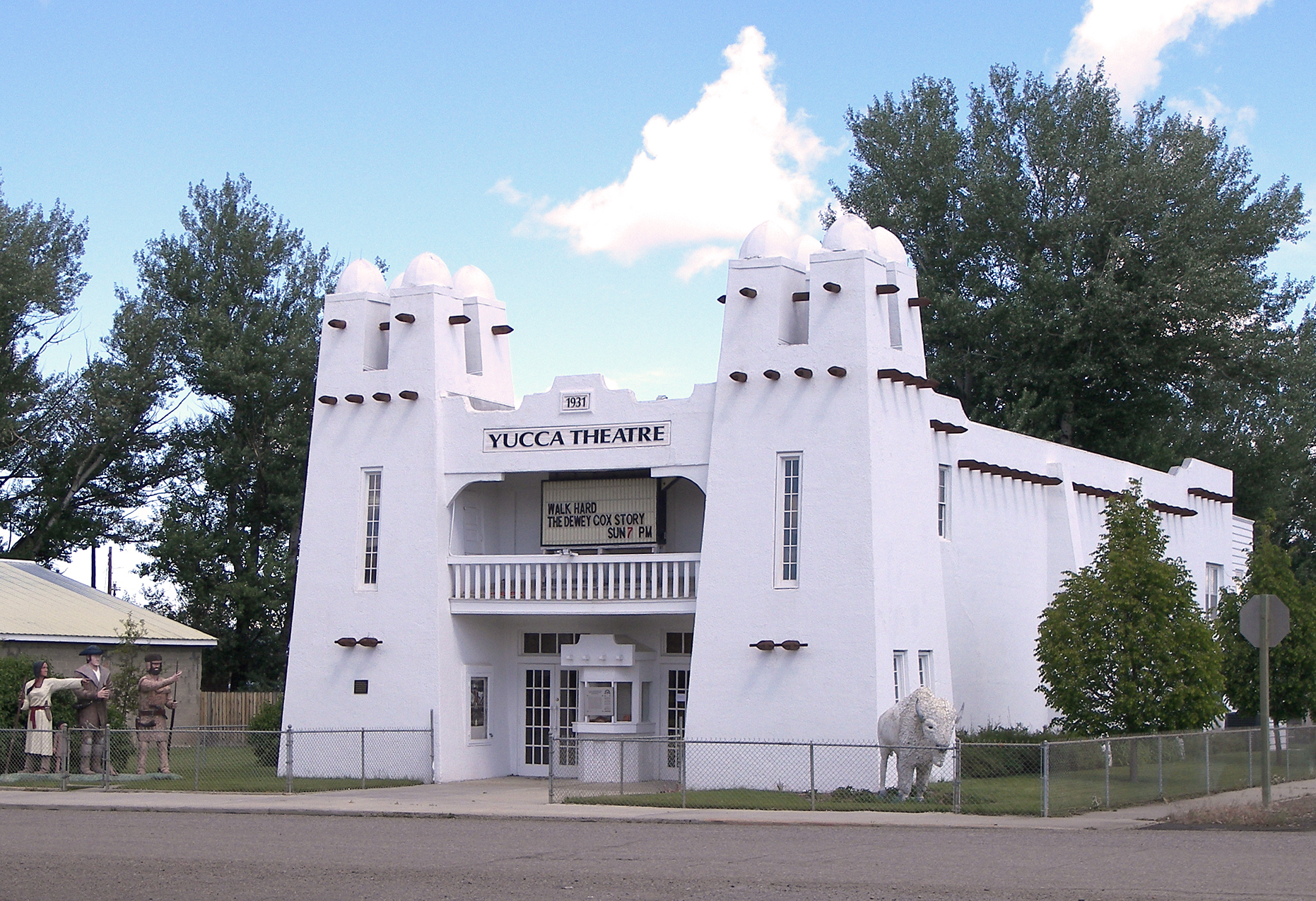
- Yucca Theatre, in Hysham, Montana.

- Location within the U.S. state of Montana
- Coordinates: 46°12′N 107°16′W
- Country: United States
- State: Montana
- Founded: 1919
- Seat: Hysham
- Largest town: Hysham

Area
  - Total: 984 sq mi (2,550 km^{2})
  - Land: 977 sq mi (2,530 km^{2})
  - Water: 6.6 sq mi (17 km^{2}) 0.7%

Population (2020)
  - Total: 762
  - Estimate (2025): 728 ▼
  - Density: 0.780/sq mi (0.301/km^{2})
- Time zone: UTC−7 (Mountain)
  - Summer (DST): UTC−6 (MDT)
- Congressional district: 2nd
- Website: www.treasurecountymt.gov
- Montana county number 33

Treasure County is a county in the U.S. state of Montana. As of the 2020 census, the population was 762, making it the second-least populous county in Montana. Its county seat is Hysham. The county was split off from Rosebud county in 1919 and named Treasure in hopes of drawing in new settlers.

== Geography ==
According to the United States Census Bureau, the county has a total area of 984 square miles (2,550 km^{2}), of which 977 square miles (2,530 km^{2}) is land and 6.6 square miles (17 km^{2}) (0.7%) is water. It is the fourth-smallest county in Montana by land area.

=== Major highways ===
- I-94
- US 10 (Former)
- S-311

=== Adjacent counties ===
- Rosebud County - northeast
- Big Horn County - south
- Yellowstone County - west

== Demographics ==
Historical population
Census	Pop.	Note	%±
1920	1,990		—
1930	1,661		−16.5%
1940	1,499		−9.8%
1950	1,402		−6.5%
1960	1,345		−4.1%
1970	1,069		−20.5%
1980	981		−8.2%
1990	874		−10.9%
2000	861		−1.5%
2010	718		−16.6%
2020	762		6.1%
2025 (est.)	728	▼	−4.5%
U.S. Decennial Census; 1790–1960, 1900–1990, 1990–2000, 2010–2020

=== 2020 census ===
As of the 2020 census, the county had a population of 762. Of the residents, 23.8% were under the age of 18 and 27.3% were 65 years of age or older; the median age was 45.0 years. For every 100 females there were 106.5 males, and for every 100 females age 18 and over there were 112.0 males. 0.0% of residents lived in urban areas and 100.0% lived in rural areas.

The racial makeup of the county was 91.6% White, 0.1% Black or African American, 2.6% American Indian and Alaska Native, 0.5% Asian, 0.7% from some other race, and 4.3% from two or more races. Hispanic or Latino residents of any race comprised 4.1% of the population.

There were 349 households in the county, of which 29.5% had children under the age of 18 living with them and 15.5% had a female householder with no spouse or partner present. About 29.5% of all households were made up of individuals and 14.9% had someone living alone who was 65 years of age or older.

There were 448 housing units, of which 22.1% were vacant. Among occupied housing units, 70.5% were owner-occupied and 29.5% were renter-occupied. The homeowner vacancy rate was 1.6% and the rental vacancy rate was 7.0%.

=== 2010 census ===
As of the 2010 census, there were 718 people, 335 households, and 219 families residing in the county. The population density was 0.7 inhabitants per square mile (0.27/km^{2}). There were 422 housing units at an average density of 0.4 per square mile (0.15/km^{2}). The racial makeup of the county was 93.9% white, 0.8% American Indian, 0.4% Asian, 1.9% from other races, and 2.9% from two or more races. Those of Hispanic or Latino origin made up 3.5% of the population. In terms of ancestry, 40.2% were American, 22.4% were German, 9.9% were English, 9.9% were Irish, and 7.4% were Norwegian.

Of the 335 households, 22.4% had children under the age of 18 living with them, 58.5% were married couples living together, 2.1% had a female householder with no husband present, 34.6% were non-families, and 32.5% of all households were made up of individuals. The average household size was 2.14 and the average family size was 2.67. The median age was 51.5 years.

The median income for a household in the county was $37,969 and the median income for a family was $51,458. Males had a median income of $38,194 versus $26,563 for females. The per capita income for the county was $20,882. About 4.6% of families and 8.2% of the population were below the poverty line, including 15.2% of those under age 18 and 5.6% of those age 65 or over.

== Politics ==
Treasure County voters are reliably Republican. They have only selected the Democratic Party candidate in five national elections (as of 2021) during the century of the county's existence as an independent unit. The Republican strength in the county has increased recently, with Donald Trump's performances in 2016, 2020, and 2024 each being the best performances ever by a Republican presidential candidate.

United States presidential election results for Treasure County, Montana
Year	Republican		Democratic		Third party(ies)	
Year	No.	%	No.	%	No.	%
1920	517	71.41%	174	24.03%	33	4.56%
1924	289	55.36%	84	16.09%	149	28.54%
1928	354	65.43%	186	34.38%	1	0.18%
1932	276	46.31%	310	52.01%	10	1.68%
1936	244	36.47%	398	59.49%	27	4.04%
1940	287	47.05%	321	52.62%	2	0.33%
1944	287	50.09%	282	49.21%	4	0.70%
1948	253	45.18%	291	51.96%	16	2.86%
1952	392	65.66%	205	34.34%	0	0.00%
1956	337	57.22%	252	42.78%	0	0.00%
1960	300	52.63%	270	47.37%	0	0.00%
1964	251	46.83%	285	53.17%	0	0.00%
1968	298	56.55%	188	35.67%	41	7.78%
1972	377	65.68%	176	30.66%	21	3.66%
1976	315	55.85%	239	42.38%	10	1.77%
1980	321	57.94%	181	32.67%	52	9.39%
1984	353	61.28%	209	36.28%	14	2.43%
1988	291	54.29%	231	43.10%	14	2.61%
1992	206	37.66%	157	28.70%	184	33.64%
1996	237	47.59%	171	34.34%	90	18.07%
2000	344	71.82%	106	22.13%	29	6.05%
2004	348	72.20%	121	25.10%	13	2.70%
2008	314	64.61%	156	32.10%	16	3.29%
2012	319	70.11%	114	25.05%	22	4.84%
2016	351	79.23%	59	13.32%	33	7.45%
2020	373	81.09%	78	16.96%	9	1.96%
2024	367	83.03%	57	12.90%	18	4.07%

== Communities ==
=== Town ===
- Hysham (county seat)

=== Unincorporated communities ===
- Bighorn, Montana
- Myers
- Sanders

=== Ghost town ===
- Rancher

== See also ==
- List of lakes in Treasure County, Montana
- List of mountains in Treasure County, Montana
- National Register of Historic Places listings in Treasure County, Montana
