= United States presidential elections in Montana =

Presidential elections in Montana
- Number of elections: 34
- Voted Democratic: 11
- Voted Republican: 23
- Voted other: 0
- Voted for winning candidate: 25
- Voted for losing candidate: 9

Following is a table of United States presidential elections in Montana, ordered by year. Since its admission to statehood in 1889, Montana has participated in every U.S. presidential election.

Winners of the state are in bold. The shading refers to the state winner, and not the national winner.

View source data.

Year	Winner (nationally)	Votes	Percent	Runner-up (nationally)	Votes	Percent	Other national candidates (Note: For purposes of these lists, other national candidates are defined as those who won at least one electoral vote, or won at least ten percent of the vote in multiple states.)	Votes	Percent	Electoral votes	Notes
2024	**Donald Trump**	352,079	58.39	Kamala Harris	231,906	38.46	—			4	
2020	Joe Biden	244,786	40.55	**Donald Trump**	343,602	56.92	—			3	
2016	**Donald Trump** (Note: Won the electoral college while losing the popular vote)	279,240	55.65	Hillary Clinton	177,709	35.41	—			3	
2012	Barack Obama	201,839	41.70	**Mitt Romney**	267,928	55.35	—			3	
2008	Barack Obama	231,667	47.25	**John McCain**	242,763	49.51	—			3	
2004	**George W. Bush**	266,063	59.07	John Kerry	173,710	38.56	—			3	
2000	**George W. Bush**	240,178	58.44	Al Gore	137,126	33.36	—			3	
1996	Bill Clinton	167,922	41.23	**Bob Dole**	179,652	44.11	Ross Perot	55,229	13.56	3	
1992	**Bill Clinton**	154,507	37.63	George H. W. Bush	144,207	35.12	Ross Perot	107,225	26.12	3	
1988	**George H. W. Bush**	190,412	52.07	Michael Dukakis	168,936	46.20	—			4	
1984	**Ronald Reagan**	232,450	60.47	Walter Mondale	146,742	38.18	—			4	
1980	**Ronald Reagan**	206,814	56.82	Jimmy Carter	118,032	32.43	John B. Anderson	29,281	8.05	4	
1976	Jimmy Carter	149,259	45.40	**Gerald Ford**	173,703	52.84	—			4	
1972	**Richard Nixon**	183,976	57.93	George McGovern	120,197	37.85	—			4	
1968	**Richard Nixon**	138,835	50.60	Hubert Humphrey	114,117	41.59	George Wallace	20,015	7.29	4	
1964	**Lyndon B. Johnson**	164,246	58.95	Barry Goldwater	113,032	40.57	—			4	
1960	John F. Kennedy	134,891	48.60	**Richard Nixon**	141,841	51.10	—			4	
1956	**Dwight D. Eisenhower**	154,933	57.13	Adlai Stevenson II	116,238	42.87	T. Coleman Andrews/ Unpledged Electors (Note: Was allied with a slate of unpledged electors in Louisiana, Mississippi and South Carolina)	—	—	4	
1952	**Dwight D. Eisenhower**	157,394	59.39	Adlai Stevenson II	106,213	40.07	—			4	
1948	**Harry S. Truman**	119,071	53.09	Thomas E. Dewey	96,770	43.15	Strom Thurmond	—	—	4	
1944	**Franklin D. Roosevelt**	112,556	54.28	Thomas E. Dewey	93,163	44.93	—			4	
1940	**Franklin D. Roosevelt**	145,698	58.78	Wendell Willkie	99,579	40.17	—			4	
1936	**Franklin D. Roosevelt**	159,690	69.28	Alf Landon	63,598	27.59	—			4	
1932	**Franklin D. Roosevelt**	127,286	58.80	Herbert Hoover	78,078	36.07	—			4	
1928	**Herbert Hoover**	113,300	58.37	Al Smith	78,578	40.48	—			4	
1924	**Calvin Coolidge**	74,138	42.50	John W. Davis	33,805	19.38	Robert M. La Follette	66,123	37.91	4	
1920	**Warren G. Harding**	109,430	61.13	James M. Cox	57,372	32.05	Parley P. Christensen	12,204	6.82	4	
1916	**Woodrow Wilson**	101,063	56.88	Charles E. Hughes	66,750	37.57	—			4	
1912	**Woodrow Wilson**	27,941	35.00	Theodore Roosevelt	22,456	28.13	William H. Taft	18,512	23.19	4	
1908	**William H. Taft**	32,333	46.98	William Jennings Bryan	29,326	42.61	—			3	
1904	**Theodore Roosevelt**	34,932	54.21	Alton B. Parker	21,773	33.79	—			3	
1900	William McKinley	25,409	39.79	**William Jennings Bryan**	37,311	58.43	—			3	
1896	William McKinley	10,509	19.71	**William Jennings Bryan**	42,628	79.93	—			3	
1892	Grover Cleveland	17,690	39.79	**Benjamin Harrison**	18,871	42.44	James B. Weaver	7,338	16.50	3	

== See also ==
- Elections in Montana
