= 1972 United States presidential election in Montana =

- November 7, 1972

Nominee	Richard Nixon	George McGovern
Party	Republican	Democratic
Home state	California	South Dakota
Running mate	Spiro Agnew	Sargent Shriver
Electoral vote	4	0
Popular vote	183,976	120,197
Percentage	57.93%	37.85%
County results
Nixon
40–50%
50–60%
60–70%
70–80%
McGovern
50–60%
60–70%
President before election
Richard Nixon
Republican
Elected President
Richard Nixon
Republican

The 1972 United States presidential election in Montana took place on November 7, 1972, and was part of the 1972 United States presidential election. Voters chose four representatives, or electors to the Electoral College, who voted for president and vice president.

Montana strongly voted for the Republican nominee, President Richard Nixon, over the Democratic nominee, Senator George McGovern. Nixon won Montana by a margin of 20.08%, making Montana around 4% more Democratic than the nation at large; McGovern's vote share was 0.4% higher than it was nationally. This was the first time since 1928 that Sheridan County voted Republican. As of the 2024 U.S. presidential election, this is the last time Montana shifted in favor of the incumbent President's party, as in the 13 subsequent presidential elections after 1972, it would shift away from every incumbent President's party.

== Results ==
1972 United States presidential election in Montana
Party	Candidate	Votes	Percentage	Electoral votes
Republican	Richard Nixon (incumbent)	183,976	57.93%	4
Democratic	George McGovern	120,197	37.85%	0
American Independent	John G. Schmitz	13,430	4.23%	0
Totals		317,603	100.00%	4

=== Results by county ===
County	Richard Nixon Republican		George McGovern Democratic		John G. Schmitz American Independent		Margin		Total votes cast
County	#	%	#	%	#	%	#	%	Total votes cast
Beaverhead	2,460	71.99%	775	22.68%	182	5.33%	1,685	49.31%	3,417
Big Horn	2,148	56.17%	1,552	40.59%	124	3.24%	596	15.58%	3,824
Blaine	1,513	54.44%	1,151	41.42%	115	4.14%	362	13.02%	2,779
Broadwater	916	66.57%	411	29.87%	49	3.56%	505	36.70%	1,376
Carbon	2,378	61.91%	1,292	33.64%	171	4.45%	1,086	28.27%	3,841
Carter	726	73.86%	218	22.18%	39	3.97%	508	51.68%	983
Cascade	16,159	52.40%	12,899	41.83%	1,778	5.77%	3,260	10.57%	30,836
Chouteau	2,027	59.64%	1,149	33.80%	223	6.56%	878	25.84%	3,399
Custer	3,486	63.31%	1,875	34.05%	145	2.63%	1,611	29.26%	5,506
Daniels	973	61.82%	570	36.21%	31	1.97%	403	25.61%	1,574
Dawson	3,207	63.96%	1,685	33.61%	122	2.43%	1,522	30.35%	5,014
Deer Lodge	2,373	35.93%	3,979	60.25%	252	3.82%	-1,606	-24.32%	6,604
Fallon	1,034	64.46%	531	33.10%	39	2.43%	503	31.36%	1,604
Fergus	4,082	67.48%	1,652	27.31%	315	5.21%	2,430	40.17%	6,049
Flathead	10,417	60.72%	5,412	31.55%	1,327	7.73%	5,005	29.17%	17,156
Gallatin	10,663	66.28%	5,096	31.68%	329	2.05%	5,567	34.60%	16,088
Garfield	695	77.83%	173	19.37%	25	2.80%	522	58.46%	893
Glacier	2,143	56.11%	1,469	38.47%	207	5.42%	674	17.64%	3,819
Golden Valley	359	64.92%	170	30.74%	24	4.34%	189	34.18%	553
Granite	804	62.28%	422	32.69%	65	5.03%	382	29.59%	1,291
Hill	3,759	53.06%	3,061	43.20%	265	3.74%	698	9.86%	7,085
Jefferson	1,281	56.06%	904	39.56%	100	4.38%	377	16.50%	2,285
Judith Basin	961	59.54%	557	34.51%	96	5.95%	404	25.03%	1,614
Lake	4,172	62.09%	2,260	33.64%	287	4.27%	1,912	28.45%	6,719
Lewis and Clark	10,719	61.90%	6,081	35.12%	516	2.98%	4,638	26.78%	17,316
Liberty	808	65.43%	365	29.55%	62	5.02%	443	35.88%	1,235
Lincoln	3,276	52.77%	2,402	38.69%	530	8.54%	874	14.08%	6,208
McCone	854	58.29%	562	38.36%	49	3.34%	292	19.93%	1,465
Madison	1,780	68.78%	669	25.85%	139	5.37%	1,111	42.93%	2,588
Meagher	674	71.55%	230	24.42%	38	4.03%	444	47.13%	942
Mineral	706	49.75%	659	46.44%	54	3.81%	47	3.31%	1,419
Missoula	15,557	51.77%	13,784	45.87%	708	2.36%	1,773	5.90%	30,049
Musselshell	1,202	61.11%	689	35.03%	76	3.86%	513	26.08%	1,967
Park	3,771	63.89%	1,923	32.58%	208	3.52%	1,848	31.31%	5,902
Petroleum	232	71.38%	87	26.77%	6	1.85%	145	44.61%	325
Phillips	1,659	64.88%	828	32.38%	70	2.74%	831	32.50%	2,557
Pondera	1,890	57.41%	1,215	36.91%	187	5.68%	675	20.50%	3,292
Powder River	844	69.35%	267	21.94%	106	8.71%	577	47.41%	1,217
Powell	1,720	59.68%	1,050	36.43%	112	3.89%	670	23.25%	2,882
Prairie	685	68.57%	303	30.33%	11	1.10%	382	38.24%	999
Ravalli	4,611	61.83%	2,480	33.25%	367	4.92%	2,131	28.58%	7,458
Richland	2,645	61.51%	1,438	33.44%	217	5.05%	1,207	28.07%	4,300
Roosevelt	2,304	58.97%	1,464	37.47%	139	3.56%	840	21.50%	3,907
Rosebud	1,486	63.23%	777	33.06%	87	3.70%	709	30.17%	2,350
Sanders	1,779	54.72%	1,197	36.82%	275	8.46%	582	17.90%	3,251
Sheridan	1,500	53.96%	1,197	43.06%	83	2.99%	303	10.90%	2,780
Silver Bow	7,967	39.05%	11,704	57.36%	733	3.59%	-3,737	-18.31%	20,404
Stillwater	1,698	67.95%	716	28.65%	85	3.40%	982	39.30%	2,499
Sweet Grass	1,260	76.00%	350	21.11%	48	2.90%	910	54.89%	1,658
Teton	1,991	59.95%	1,121	33.75%	209	6.29%	870	26.20%	3,321
Toole	1,679	59.64%	897	31.87%	239	8.49%	782	27.77%	2,815
Treasure	377	65.68%	176	30.66%	21	3.66%	201	35.02%	574
Valley	3,210	60.02%	1,973	36.89%	165	3.09%	1,237	23.13%	5,348
Wheatland	761	57.39%	445	33.56%	120	9.05%	316	23.83%	1,326
Wibaux	390	55.48%	283	40.26%	30	4.27%	107	15.22%	703
Yellowstone	25,205	62.64%	13,602	33.80%	1,430	3.55%	11,603	28.84%	40,237
Totals	183,976	57.93%	120,197	37.85%	13,430	4.23%	63,779	20.08%	317,603

== See also ==
- United States presidential elections in Montana
