= 1900 United States presidential election in Montana =

- November 6, 1900

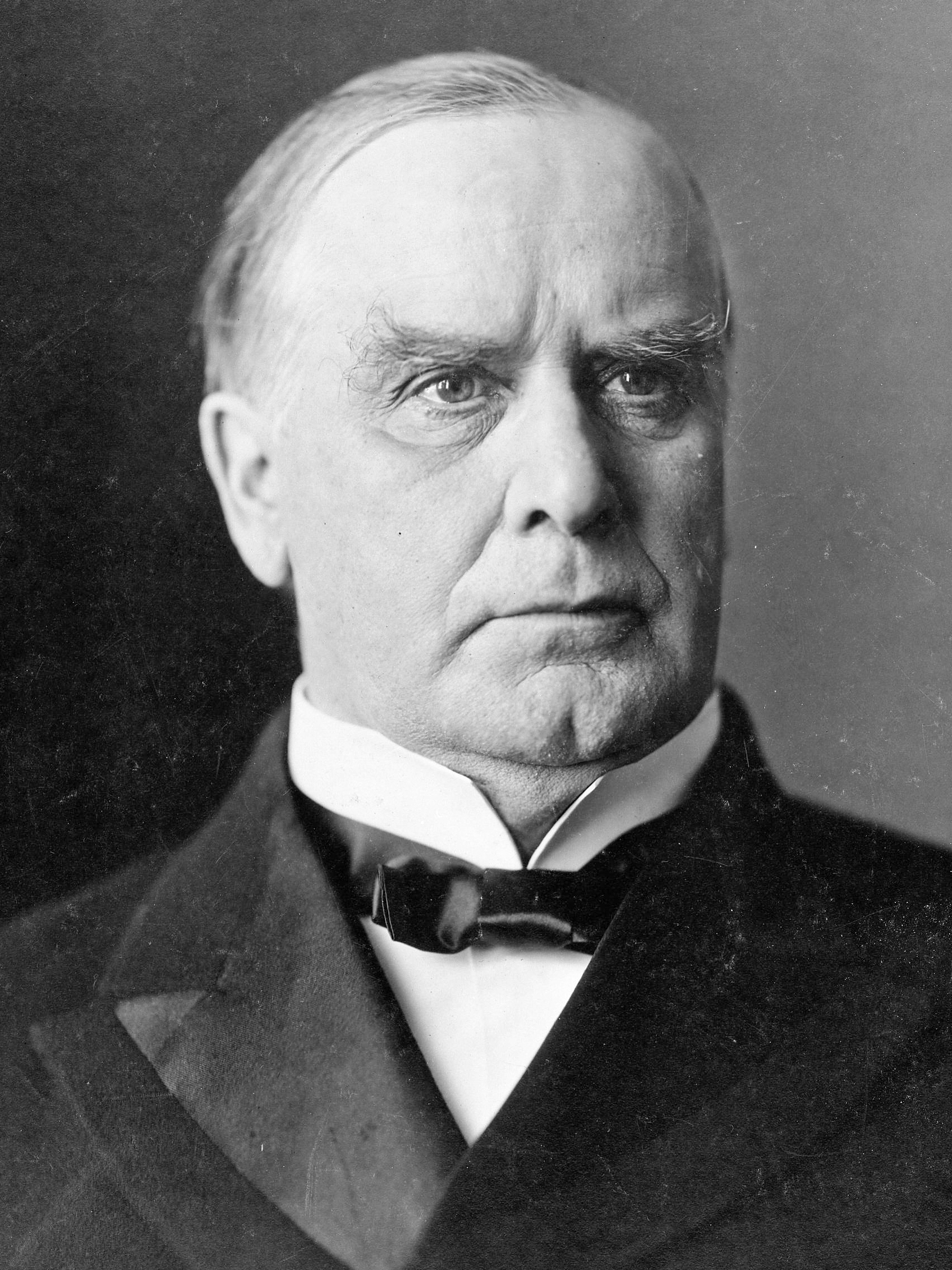
Nominee	William Jennings Bryan	William McKinley
Party	Democratic	Republican
Home state	Nebraska	Ohio
Running mate	Adlai Stevenson I	Theodore Roosevelt
Electoral vote	3	0
Popular vote	37,311	25,409
Percentage	58.43%	39.79%
County results
Bryan
50–60%
60–70%
70–80%
McKinley
40–50%
50–60%
60–70%
70–80%
President before election
William McKinley
Republican
Elected President
William McKinley
Republican

The 1900 United States presidential election in Montana took place on November 6, 1900, as part of the 1900 United States presidential election. Voters chose three representatives, or electors to the Electoral College, who voted for president and vice president.

Montana overwhelmingly voted for the Democratic nominee, former U.S. Representative and 1896 Democratic presidential nominee William Jennings Bryan, over the Republican nominee, President William McKinley. Bryan won Montana by a landslide margin of 18.64% in this rematch of the 1896 presidential election. The return of economic prosperity and recent victory in the Spanish–American War helped McKinley more than double his votes from the previous election, but he still lost decisively.

Bryan had previously defeated McKinley in the state four years earlier but would later lose the state to William Howard Taft in 1908. As of the 2024 election, this is the last time a Republican won the presidency without winning Montana.

== Results ==
1900 United States presidential election in Montana
Party	Candidate	Votes	Percentage	Electoral votes
Democratic	William Jennings Bryan	37,311	58.43%	3
Republican	William McKinley (incumbent)	25,409	39.79%	0
Socialist	Eugene V. Debs	711	1.11%	0
Prohibition	John G. Woolley	306	0.48%	0
Socialist Labor	Joseph F. Maloney	119	0.19%	0
Totals		63,856	100.00%	3

=== Results by county ===
County	William Jennings Bryan Democratic		William McKinley Republican		Various candidates Other parties		Margin		Total votes cast
County	#	%	#	%	#	%	#	%	Total votes cast
Beaverhead	937	54.73%	767	44.80%	8	0.47%	170	9.93%	1,712
Broadwater	572	63.49%	318	35.29%	11	1.22%	254	28.19%	901
Carbon	907	48.61%	930	49.84%	29	1.55%	-23	-1.23%	1,866
Cascade	2,564	55.16%	1,997	42.96%	87	1.87%	567	12.20%	4,648
Chouteau	629	36.13%	1,098	63.07%	14	0.80%	-469	-26.94%	1,741
Custer	477	32.58%	980	66.94%	7	0.48%	-503	-34.36%	1,464
Dawson	209	28.36%	521	70.69%	7	0.95%	-312	-42.33%	737
Deer Lodge	3,395	65.38%	1,636	31.50%	162	3.12%	1,759	33.87%	5,193
Fergus	913	42.33%	1,228	56.93%	16	0.74%	-315	-14.60%	2,157
Flathead	1,201	51.22%	1,104	47.08%	40	1.71%	97	4.14%	2,345
Gallatin	1,297	51.53%	1,146	45.53%	74	2.94%	151	6.00%	2,517
Granite	1,020	71.08%	401	27.94%	14	0.98%	619	43.14%	1,435
Jefferson	980	65.42%	488	32.58%	30	2.00%	492	32.84%	1,498
Lewis and Clark	2,763	56.84%	2,043	42.03%	55	1.13%	720	14.81%	4,861
Madison	1,298	55.28%	1,030	43.87%	20	0.85%	268	11.41%	2,348
Meagher	406	49.33%	414	50.30%	3	0.36%	-8	-0.97%	823
Missoula	1,893	56.92%	1,392	41.85%	41	1.23%	501	15.06%	3,326
Park	900	47.82%	903	47.98%	79	4.20%	-3	-0.16%	1,882
Ravalli	1,052	52.81%	892	44.78%	48	2.41%	160	8.03%	1,992
Silver Bow	12,101	74.19%	3,873	23.75%	336	2.06%	8,228	50.45%	16,310
Sweet Grass	287	38.37%	460	61.50%	1	0.13%	-173	-23.13%	748
Teton	457	43.94%	573	55.10%	10	0.96%	-116	-11.15%	1,040
Valley	234	39.00%	363	60.50%	3	0.50%	-129	-21.50%	600
Yellowstone	654	43.69%	816	54.51%	27	1.80%	-162	-10.82%	1,497
Totals	37,146	58.37%	25,373	39.87%	1,122	1.76%	11,773	18.50%	63,641

== See also ==
- United States presidential elections in Montana
