= 1908 United States presidential election in Montana =

- November 3, 1908

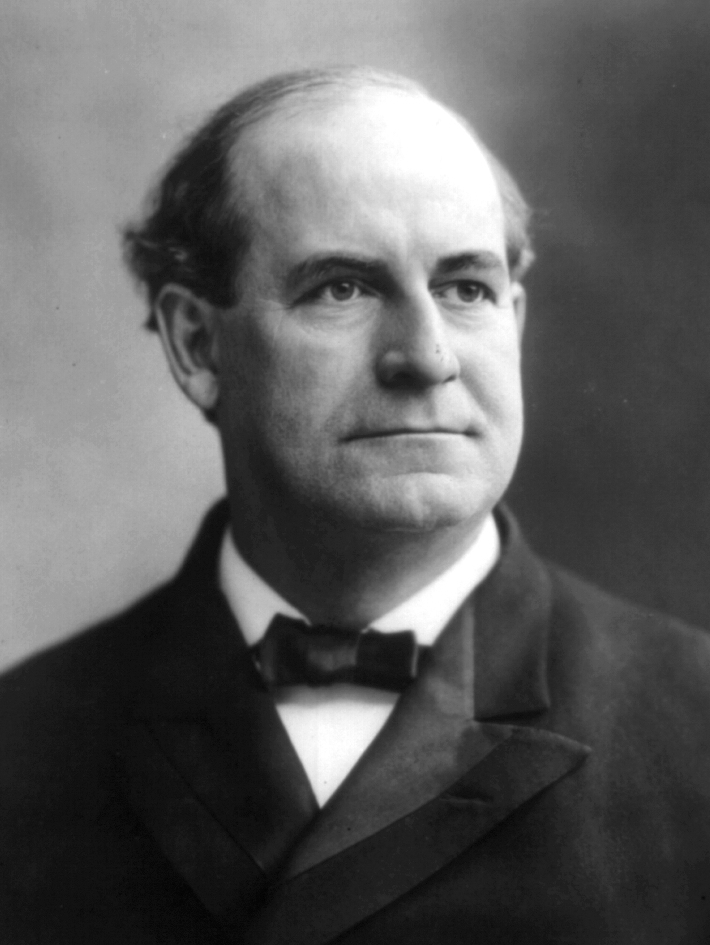

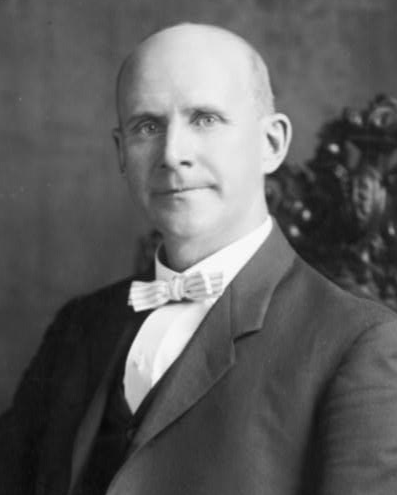
Nominee	William Howard Taft	William Jennings Bryan	Eugene V. Debs
Party	Republican	Democratic	Socialist
Home state	Ohio	Nebraska	Indiana
Running mate	James S. Sherman	John W. Kern	Ben Hanford
Electoral vote	3	0	0
Popular vote	32,333	29,326	5,855
Percentage	46.98%	42.61%	8.51%
County results
Taft
40–50%
50–60%
60–70%
Bryan
40–50%
50–60%
President before election
Theodore Roosevelt
Republican
Elected President
William Howard Taft
Republican

The 1908 United States presidential election in Montana took place on November 3, 1908, as part of the 1908 United States presidential election. Voters chose three representatives, or electors to the Electoral College, who voted for president and vice president.

Montana voted for the Republican nominees, Secretary of War William Howard Taft of Ohio and his running mate James S. Sherman of New York. They defeated the Democratic nominees, former U.S. Representative of Nebraska William Jennings Bryan and his running mate John W. Kern of Indiana. Taft won the state by a narrow margin of 4.37%.

Bryan had previously won Montana by large margins in both 1896 and 1900, defeating William McKinley both times.

== Results ==
1908 United States presidential election in Montana
Party	Candidate	Votes	Percentage	Electoral votes
Republican	William Howard Taft	32,333	46.98%	3
Democratic	William Jennings Bryan	29,326	42.61%	0
Socialist	Eugene V. Debs	5,855	8.51%	0
Prohibition	Eugene W. Chafin	827	1.20%	0
Independence	Thomas L. Hisgen	481	0.70%	0
Totals		68,822	100.00%	3

=== Results by county ===
County	William Howard Taft Republican		William Jennings Bryan Democratic		Various candidates Other parties		Margin		Total votes cast
County	#	%	#	%	#	%	#	%	Total votes cast
Beaverhead	878	51.95%	739	43.73%	73	4.32%	139	8.22%	1,690
Broadwater	326	37.86%	495	57.49%	40	4.65%	-169	-19.63%	861
Carbon	1,205	52.01%	844	36.43%	268	11.57%	361	15.58%	2,317
Cascade	1,935	44.86%	1,888	43.77%	490	11.36%	47	1.09%	4,313
Chouteau	1,220	54.73%	893	40.06%	116	5.20%	327	14.67%	2,229
Custer	967	60.66%	531	33.31%	96	6.02%	436	27.35%	1,594
Dawson	927	63.67%	439	30.15%	90	6.18%	488	33.52%	1,456
Deer Lodge	1,377	43.67%	1,611	51.09%	165	5.23%	-234	-7.42%	3,153
Fergus	1,529	52.43%	1,112	38.13%	275	9.43%	417	14.30%	2,916
Flathead	1,838	49.45%	1,480	39.82%	399	10.73%	358	9.63%	3,717
Gallatin	1,519	47.19%	1,485	46.13%	215	6.68%	34	1.06%	3,219
Granite	369	40.46%	485	53.18%	58	6.36%	-116	-12.72%	912
Jefferson	546	39.22%	714	51.29%	132	9.48%	-168	-12.07%	1,392
Lewis and Clark	2,033	45.89%	2,062	46.55%	335	7.56%	-29	-0.65%	4,430
Madison	964	46.68%	1,029	49.83%	72	3.49%	-65	-3.15%	2,065
Meagher	495	59.57%	314	37.79%	22	2.65%	181	21.78%	831
Missoula	1,856	46.15%	1,780	44.26%	386	9.60%	76	1.89%	4,022
Park	1,305	50.92%	952	37.14%	306	11.94%	353	13.77%	2,563
Powell	599	49.63%	560	46.40%	48	3.98%	39	3.23%	1,207
Ravalli	1,045	48.09%	859	39.53%	269	12.38%	186	8.56%	2,173
Rosebud	515	66.03%	235	30.13%	30	3.85%	280	35.90%	780
Sanders	473	55.00%	325	37.79%	62	7.21%	148	17.21%	860
Silver Bow	4,618	33.82%	6,255	45.80%	2,783	20.38%	-1,637	-11.99%	13,656
Sweet Grass	526	63.76%	264	32.00%	35	4.24%	262	31.76%	825
Teton	622	60.39%	358	34.76%	50	4.85%	264	25.63%	1,030
Valley	843	59.12%	503	35.27%	80	5.61%	340	23.84%	1,426
Yellowstone	1,803	56.61%	1,114	34.98%	268	8.41%	689	21.63%	3,185
Totals	32,333	46.98%	29,326	42.61%	7,163	10.41%	3,007	4.37%	68,822

== See also ==
- United States presidential elections in Montana
