= 1920 United States presidential election in Montana =

- November 2, 1920
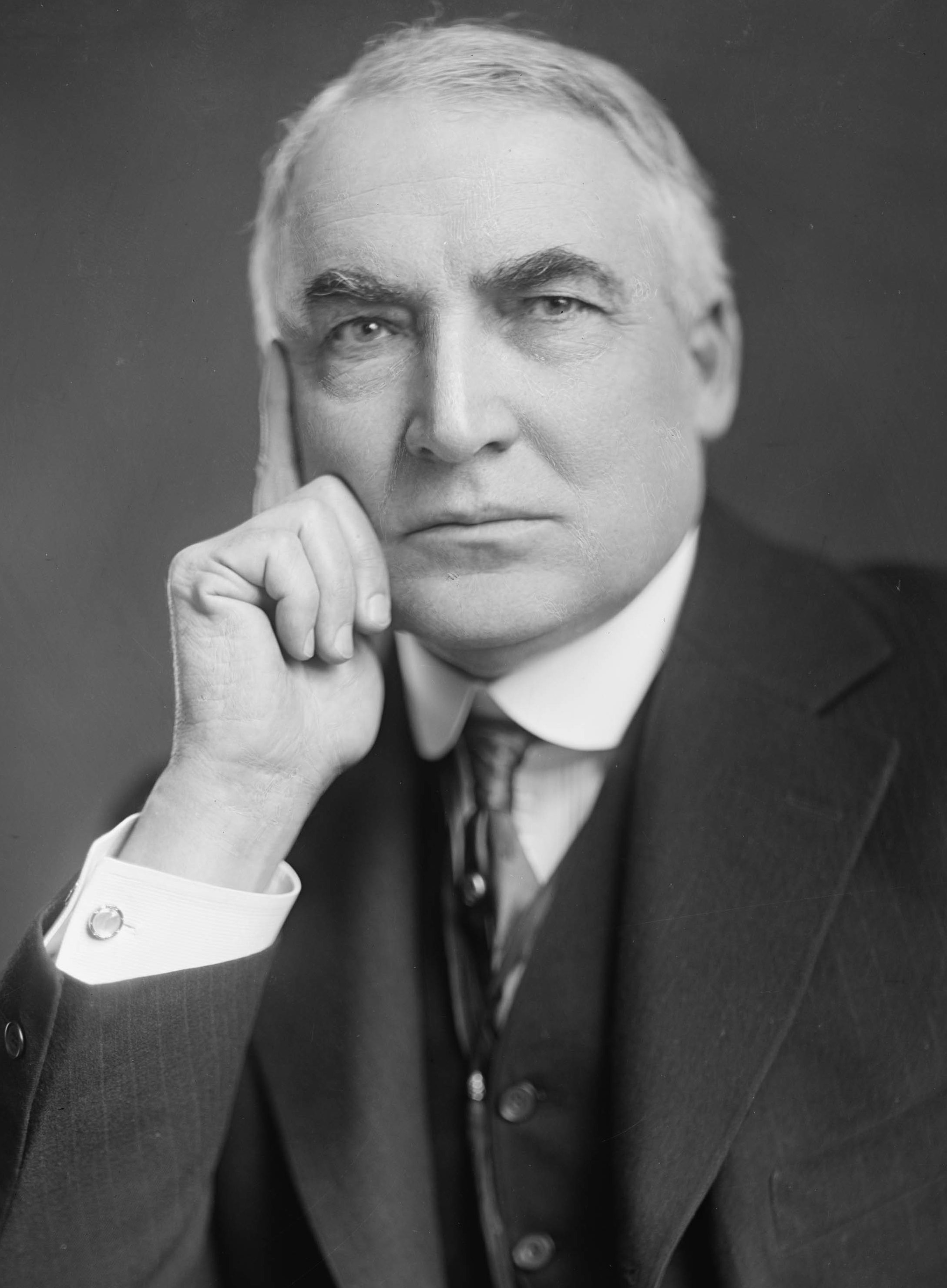

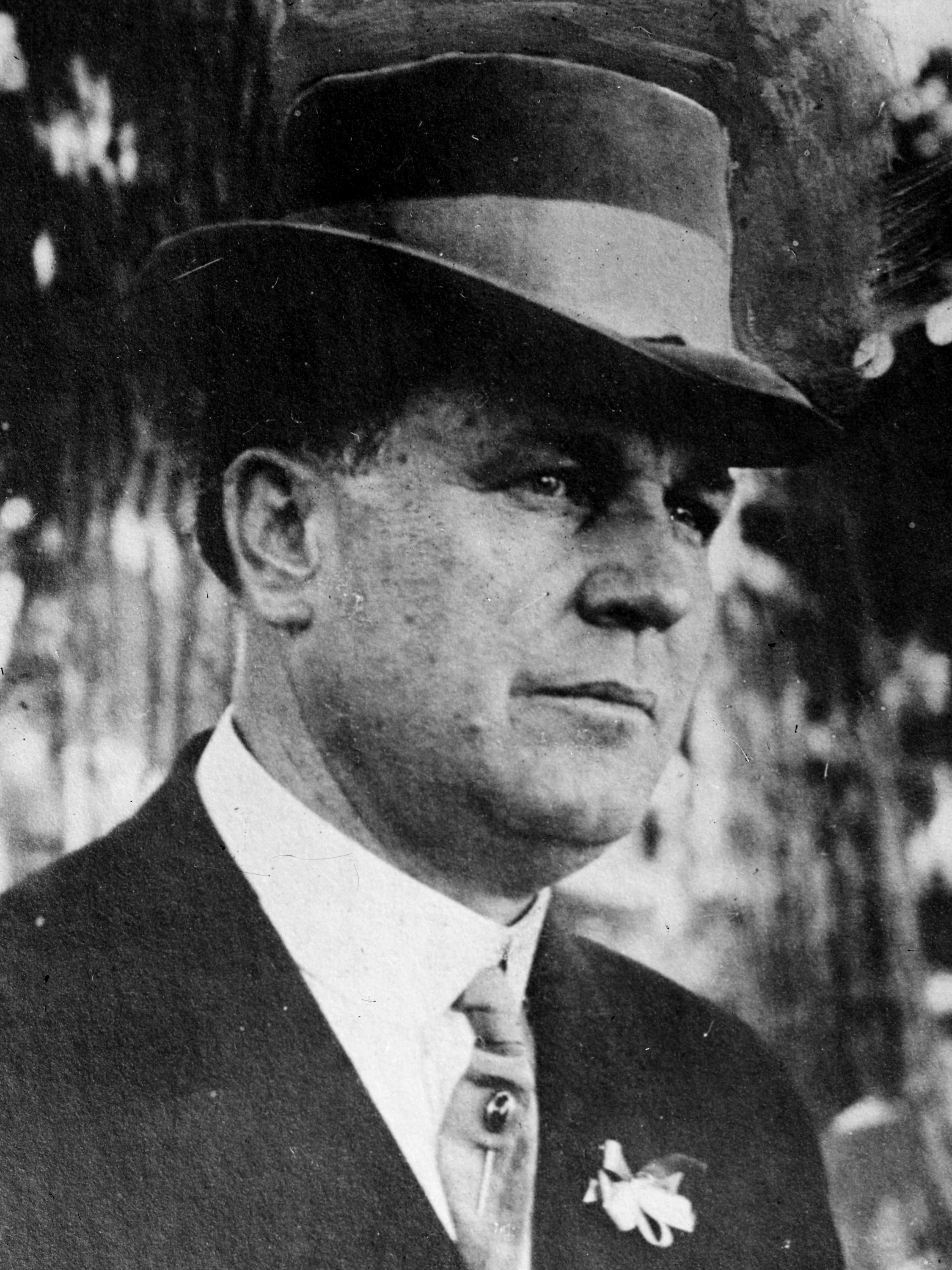
Nominee	Warren G. Harding	James M. Cox	Parley P. Christensen
Party	Republican	Democratic	Farmer–Labor
Home state	Ohio	Ohio	Illinois
Running mate	Calvin Coolidge	Franklin D. Roosevelt	Max S. Hayes
Electoral vote	4	0	0
Popular vote	109,430	57,372	12,204
Percentage	61.13%	32.05%	6.82%
County results
Harding
50–60%
60–70%
70–80%
Cox
40–50%
President before election
Woodrow Wilson
Democratic
Elected President
Warren G. Harding
Republican

The 1920 United States presidential election in Montana took place on November 2, 1920, as part of the 1920 United States presidential election. Voters chose four representatives, or electors to the Electoral College, who voted for president and vice president.

Like all of the Western United States, severe anger at President Woodrow Wilson's decision to renege on his promise to keep the United States out of World War I produced extreme hostility among the strongly isolationist population of remote Montana. In addition, by the beginning of 1920 skyrocketing inflation and Wilson's focus upon his proposed League of Nations at the expense of domestic policy had helped make the incumbent president very unpopular – besides which Wilson also had major health problems that had left First Lady Edith effectively running the nation. Political unrest seen in the Palmer Raids and the "Red Scare" further added to the unpopularity of the Democratic Party, since this global political turmoil produced considerable fear of alien revolutionaries invading the country. Demand in the West for exclusion of Asian immigrants became even stronger than it had been before. Another factor hurting the Democratic Party was the migration of many people from the traditionally Republican Upper Midwest into the state.

Because the West had been the chief presidential battleground ever since the "System of 1896" emerged following that election, Governor Cox traveled across the western states in August and September, but he did not visit Montana with its tiny population and poverty of electoral votes. No polls were taken in the state, but a Republican success was universally assumed.

Montana overwhelmingly voted for the Republican nominee, Senator Warren G. Harding, over the Democratic nominee, Ohio Governor James M. Cox. Harding won Montana by a landslide margin of 29.08%. Whereas Wilson had carried every county except Sweet Grass in 1916, Harding won every county except Mineral, which he lost narrowly by just fifteen votes. However, within the thirteen states north of Arizona and west of Missouri, Mineral was along with Clark County, Nevada one of only two counties to give a plurality to Cox. As of 2024, this is the last time that Deer Lodge County has given a majority of the vote to a Republican. Harding's 61.1% vote share and 29 percentage point margin remain the strongest performance by a Republican presidential nominee in Montana history.

== Results ==
1920 United States presidential election in Montana
Party	Candidate	Votes	Percentage	Electoral votes
Republican	Warren G. Harding	109,430	61.13%	4
Democratic	James M. Cox	57,372	32.05%	0
Farmer-Labor	Parley P. Christensen	12,204	6.82%	0
Totals		178,940	100.00%	4

=== Results by county ===
County	Warren G. Harding Republican		James M. Cox Democratic		Parley P. Christensen Farmer–Labor		Margin		Total votes cast
County	#	%	#	%	#	%	#	%	Total votes cast
Beaverhead	2,049	68.80%	833	27.97%	96	3.22%	1,216	40.83%	2,978
Big Horn	1,062	66.17%	475	29.60%	68	4.24%	587	36.57%	1,605
Blaine	1,720	62.48%	848	30.80%	185	6.72%	872	31.67%	2,753
Broadwater	723	51.50%	622	44.30%	59	4.20%	101	7.19%	1,404
Carbon	2,700	64.07%	1,107	26.27%	407	9.66%	1,593	37.80%	4,214
Carter	782	66.84%	342	29.23%	46	3.93%	440	37.61%	1,170
Cascade	6,808	58.83%	3,938	34.03%	826	7.14%	2,870	24.80%	11,572
Chouteau	2,646	60.86%	1,436	33.03%	266	6.12%	1,210	27.83%	4,348
Custer	2,347	64.53%	1,127	30.99%	163	4.48%	1,220	33.54%	3,637
Daniels	811	60.12%	289	21.42%	249	18.46%	522	38.70%	1,349
Dawson	1,784	63.92%	875	31.35%	132	4.73%	909	32.57%	2,791
Deer Lodge	3,130	59.97%	1,567	30.02%	522	10.00%	1,563	29.95%	5,219
Fallon	1,064	71.36%	381	25.55%	46	3.09%	683	45.81%	1,491
Fergus	5,858	60.22%	3,371	34.66%	498	5.12%	2,487	25.57%	9,727
Flathead	3,900	59.26%	2,241	34.05%	440	6.69%	1,659	25.21%	6,581
Gallatin	3,238	54.70%	2,370	40.03%	312	5.27%	868	14.66%	5,920
Garfield	1,226	68.19%	484	26.92%	88	4.89%	742	41.27%	1,798
Glacier	1,297	69.14%	531	28.30%	48	2.56%	766	40.83%	1,876
Golden Valley	1,185	72.57%	381	23.33%	67	4.10%	804	49.23%	1,633
Granite	949	64.21%	439	29.70%	90	6.09%	510	34.51%	1,478
Hill	2,220	55.44%	1,388	34.67%	396	9.89%	832	20.78%	4,004
Jefferson	969	54.47%	688	38.67%	122	6.86%	281	15.80%	1,779
Lewis and Clark	4,348	62.90%	2,413	34.91%	152	2.20%	1,935	27.99%	6,913
Liberty	757	63.61%	331	27.82%	102	8.57%	426	35.80%	1,190
Lincoln	1,187	57.54%	683	33.11%	193	9.36%	504	24.43%	2,063
Madison	1,672	63.19%	877	33.14%	97	3.67%	795	30.05%	2,646
McCone	1,111	60.64%	537	29.31%	184	10.04%	574	31.33%	1,832
Meagher	744	69.08%	314	29.16%	19	1.76%	430	39.93%	1,077
Mineral	347	39.03%	362	40.72%	180	20.25%	-15	-1.69%	889
Missoula	4,374	52.61%	3,292	39.60%	648	7.79%	1,082	13.01%	8,314
Musselshell	1,910	59.22%	951	29.49%	364	11.29%	959	29.74%	3,225
Park	2,537	63.11%	1,155	28.73%	328	8.16%	1,382	34.38%	4,020
Phillips	1,693	67.13%	648	25.69%	181	7.18%	1,045	41.44%	2,522
Pondera	1,654	62.49%	893	33.74%	100	3.78%	761	28.75%	2,647
Powder River	955	71.27%	330	24.63%	55	4.10%	625	46.64%	1,340
Powell	1,345	57.19%	787	33.46%	220	9.35%	558	23.72%	2,352
Prairie	881	76.68%	242	21.06%	26	2.26%	639	55.61%	1,149
Ravalli	2,110	60.49%	1,224	35.09%	154	4.42%	886	25.40%	3,488
Richland	1,759	65.46%	744	27.69%	184	6.85%	1,015	37.77%	2,687
Roosevelt	2,239	68.22%	873	26.60%	170	5.18%	1,366	41.62%	3,282
Rosebud	1,624	71.26%	555	24.35%	100	4.39%	1,069	46.91%	2,279
Sanders	1,035	51.49%	741	36.87%	234	11.64%	294	14.63%	2,010
Sheridan	1,335	53.46%	610	24.43%	552	22.11%	725	29.03%	2,497
Silver Bow	10,074	55.36%	6,394	35.14%	1,730	9.51%	3,680	20.22%	18,198
Stillwater	1,721	70.50%	664	27.20%	56	2.29%	1,057	43.30%	2,441
Sweet Grass	1,035	73.51%	349	24.79%	24	1.70%	686	48.72%	1,408
Teton	1,319	62.25%	671	31.67%	129	6.09%	648	30.58%	2,119
Toole	861	61.28%	405	28.83%	139	9.89%	456	32.46%	1,405
Treasure	517	71.41%	174	24.03%	33	4.56%	343	47.38%	724
Valley	2,096	62.89%	895	26.85%	342	10.26%	1,201	36.03%	3,333
Wheatland	1,250	68.79%	520	28.62%	47	2.59%	730	40.18%	1,817
Wibaux	692	71.64%	223	23.08%	51	5.28%	469	48.55%	966
Yellowstone	5,714	65.08%	2,782	31.69%	284	3.23%	2,932	33.39%	8,780
Totals	109,364	61.12%	57,372	32.06%	12,204	6.82%	51,992	29.06%	178,940

== See also ==
- United States presidential elections in Montana
