= 1916 United States presidential election in Montana =

- November 7, 1916

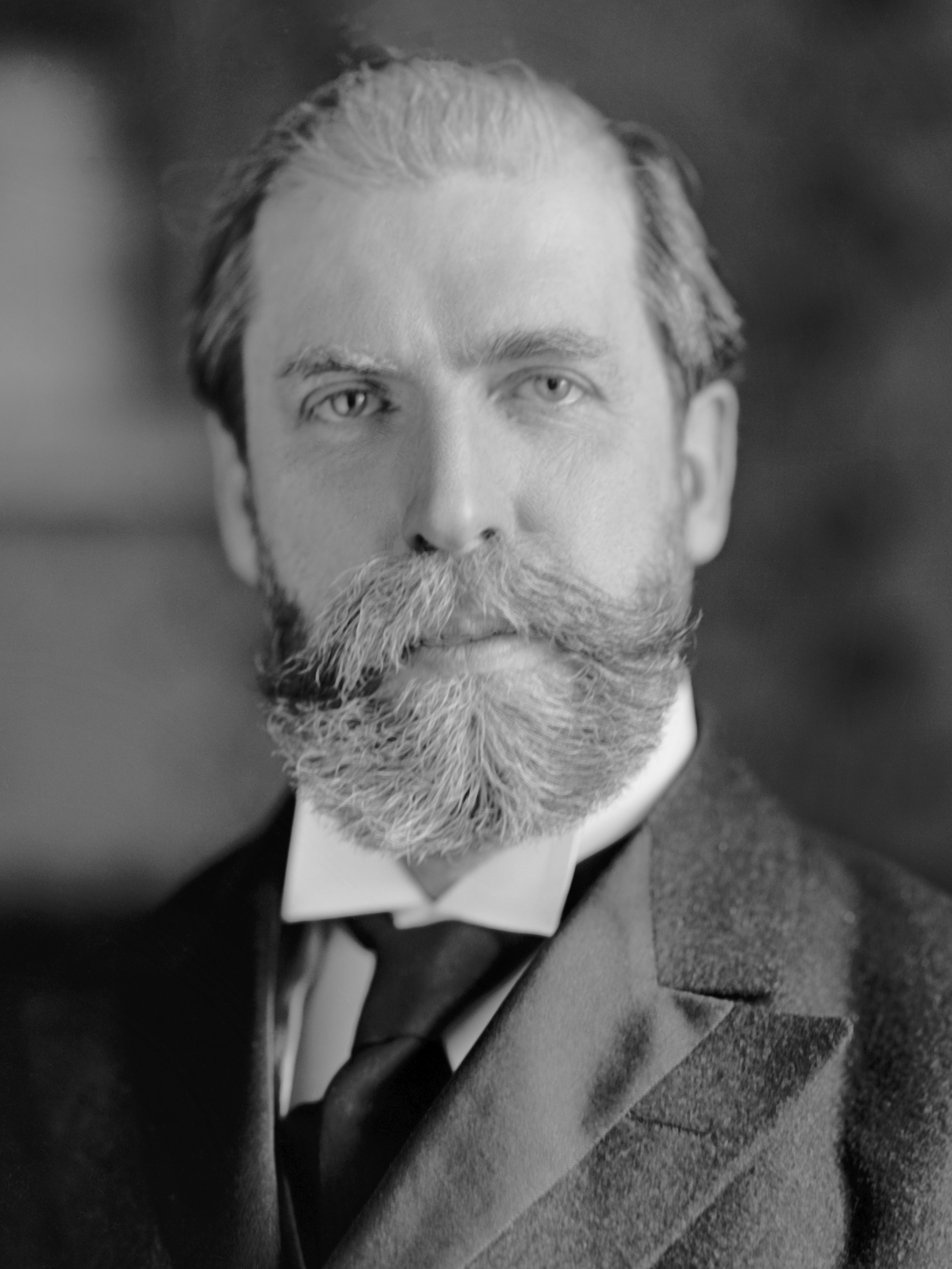

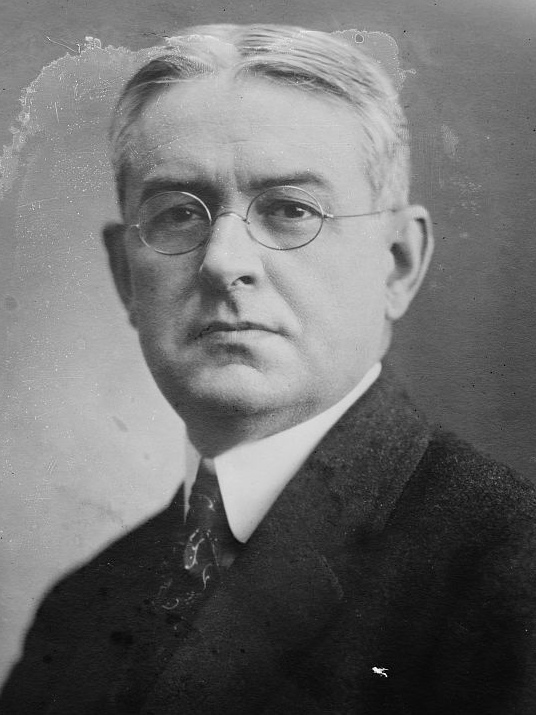
Nominee	Woodrow Wilson	Charles Evans Hughes	Allan L. Benson
Party	Democratic	Republican	Socialist
Home state	New Jersey	New York	New York
Running mate	Thomas R. Marshall	Charles W. Fairbanks	George Ross Kirkpatrick
Electoral vote	4	0	0
Popular vote	101,063	66,750	9,564
Percentage	56.88%	37.57%	5.38%
County results
Wilson
40–50%
50–60%
60–70%
Hughes
50–60%
President before election
Woodrow Wilson
Democratic
Elected President
Woodrow Wilson
Democratic

The 1916 United States presidential election in Montana took place on November 7, 1916 as a part of the 1916 United States presidential election. Voters chose four representatives, or electors to the Electoral College, who voted for president and vice president.

Montana overwhelmingly voted for the Democratic nominee, President Woodrow Wilson, over the Republican nominee, U.S. Supreme Court Justice and former New York Governor Charles Evans Hughes. Wilson won the state by a large margin of 19.31%.

== Primary elections ==
=== Republican primary ===
The Republican primary took place on April 21, 1916. Iowa Senator Albert B. Cummins would convincingly win. Cummins would be one of two candidates on the ballot with favorite son, Edward Randolph Woods.

1916 Montana Republican presidential primary
Candidate	Votes	%
Albert B. Cummins	10,415	68.43
Roosevelt (write-in)	2,635	17.31
Edward Randolph Woods	1,173	7.71
C. E. Hughes (write-in)	564	3.71
Elihu Root (write-in)	137	0.90
Henry Ford (write-in)	134	0.88
La Follette (write-in)	64	0.42
Woodrow Wilson (write-in)	36	0.24
Lawrence Y. Sherman (write-in)	16	0.11
Wm. H. Taft (write-in)	9	0.06
Leonard Wood (write-in)	8	0.05
W. E. Borah (write-in)	5	0.03
Esterbrook (write-in)	3	0.02
McCall (write-in)	2	0.01
Jos. Dixon (write-in)	2	0.01
Weeks (write-in)	2	0.01
Dupont (write-in)	1	0.01
Beveridge (write-in)	1	0.01
Total	15,220	100.0

=== Democratic primary ===
The Democratic primary took place on April 21, 1916. Incumbent president, Woodrow Wilson, ran virtually unopposed in the Democratic primary.

1916 Montana Democratic presidential primary
Candidate	Votes	%
Woodrow Wilson	17,960	99.24
W. J. Bryan (write-in)	88	0.49
Champ Clark (write-in)	41	0.23
Henry Ford (write-in)	5	0.03
Roosevelt (write-in)	3	0.02
W. E. Borah (write-in)	1	0.01
Total	18,098	100.0

=== Progressive primary ===
The Progressive primary took place on April 21, 1916. The two members of the ticket from 1912, Theodore Roosevelt and Hiram Johnson were the two major candidates.

1916 Montana Progressive presidential primary
Candidate	Votes	%
Hiram Johnson	1,519	56.66
Roosevelt (write-in)	1,125	41.96
La Follette (write-in)	19	0.71
Woodrow Wilson (write-in)	11	0.41
Hughes (write-in)	5	0.19
Cummins (write-in)	1	0.04
Bryan (write-in)	1	0.04
Total	2,681	100.0

=== Socialist primary ===
The Socialist primary took place on April 21, 1916. Eventual nominee and newspaper editor Allan L. Benson would receive all but one vote.

1916 Montana Socialist presidential primary
Candidate	Votes	%
Allan L. Benson	1,843	99.95
Woodrow Wilson (write-in)	1	0.05
Total	1,844	100.0

== Results ==
General election results
Party	Pledged to	Elector	Votes
Democratic Party	Woodrow Wilson	W. M. Bole	101,063
Democratic Party	Woodrow Wilson	Thomas McTague	99,766
Democratic Party	Woodrow Wilson	Charles M. Mansur	99,681
Democratic Party	Woodrow Wilson	M. C. Morris	99,423
Republican Party	Charles Evans Hughes	Thomas A. Cummings	66,750
Republican Party	Charles Evans Hughes	J. W. Johnston	65,828
Republican Party	Charles Evans Hughes	W. D. Symmes	65,209
Republican Party	Charles Evans Hughes	R. G. Wiggenborn	65,129
Socialist Party	Allan L. Benson	L. J. Duncan	9,564
Socialist Party	Allan L. Benson	C. R. Dauterman	9,416
Socialist Party	Allan L. Benson	Henry La Beau	9,217
Socialist Party	Allan L. Benson	Frank Mabie	9,213
Progressive Party	Unpledged	A. W. Merrifield	302
Progressive Party	Unpledged	L. J. Hamilton	298
Progressive Party	Unpledged	A. J. Walrath	265
Progressive Party	Unpledged	J. W. Wedum	259
Total votes			177,679

=== Results by county ===
County	Woodrow Wilson Democratic		Charles Evans Hughes Republican		Allan L. Benson Socialist		No candidate Progressive "Bull Moose"		Margin		Total votes cast
County	#	%	#	%	#	%	#	%	#	%	Total votes cast
Beaverhead	1,463	48.65%	1,455	48.39%	89	2.96%	0	0.00%	8	0.27%	3,007
Big Horn	740	59.01%	497	39.63%	15	1.20%	2	0.16%	243	19.38%	1,254
Blaine	1,261	57.58%	857	39.13%	72	3.29%	0	0.00%	404	18.45%	2,190
Broadwater	1,100	63.00%	584	33.45%	53	3.04%	9	0.52%	516	29.55%	1,746
Carbon	1,926	47.99%	1,708	42.56%	379	9.44%	0	0.00%	218	5.43%	4,013
Cascade	6,612	62.14%	3,253	30.57%	758	7.12%	18	0.17%	3,359	31.57%	10,641
Chouteau	2,738	61.95%	1,486	33.62%	183	4.14%	13	0.29%	1,252	28.33%	4,420
Custer	2,602	59.69%	1,615	37.05%	141	3.23%	1	0.02%	987	22.64%	4,359
Dawson	2,835	55.30%	2,105	41.06%	187	3.65%	0	0.00%	730	14.24%	5,127
Deer Lodge	4,171	67.90%	1,860	30.28%	109	1.77%	3	0.05%	2,311	37.62%	6,143
Fallon	1,845	59.25%	1,169	37.54%	95	3.05%	5	0.16%	676	21.71%	3,114
Fergus	5,749	61.00%	3,290	34.91%	380	4.03%	5	0.05%	2,459	26.09%	9,424
Flathead	2,978	46.34%	2,913	45.33%	520	8.09%	15	0.23%	65	1.01%	6,426
Gallatin	3,661	58.06%	2,527	40.07%	116	1.84%	2	0.03%	1,134	17.98%	6,306
Granite	812	54.90%	574	38.81%	89	6.02%	4	0.27%	238	16.09%	1,479
Hill	3,241	60.17%	1,709	31.73%	428	7.95%	8	0.15%	1,532	28.44%	5,386
Jefferson	1,124	57.82%	712	36.63%	104	5.35%	4	0.21%	412	21.19%	1,944
Lewis and Clark	4,337	54.47%	3,423	42.99%	200	2.51%	2	0.03%	914	11.48%	7,962
Lincoln	1,186	51.95%	807	35.35%	288	12.61%	2	0.09%	379	16.60%	2,283
Madison	1,672	55.40%	1,279	42.38%	67	2.22%	0	0.00%	393	13.02%	3,018
Meagher	1,482	55.15%	1,158	43.10%	46	1.71%	1	0.04%	324	12.06%	2,687
Mineral	781	63.70%	251	20.47%	188	15.33%	6	0.49%	530	43.23%	1,226
Missoula	4,069	53.80%	2,926	38.69%	558	7.38%	10	0.13%	1,143	15.11%	7,563
Musselshell	2,036	50.28%	1,738	42.92%	274	6.77%	1	0.02%	298	7.36%	4,049
Park	2,050	47.57%	1,957	45.42%	297	6.89%	5	0.12%	93	2.16%	4,309
Phillips	1,252	53.16%	999	42.42%	102	4.33%	2	0.08%	253	10.74%	2,355
Powell	1,340	56.73%	939	39.75%	83	3.51%	0	0.00%	401	16.98%	2,362
Prairie	622	52.76%	535	45.38%	22	1.87%	0	0.00%	87	7.38%	1,179
Ravalli	1,967	51.38%	1,623	42.40%	233	6.09%	5	0.13%	344	8.99%	3,828
Richland	1,947	58.12%	1,223	36.51%	180	5.37%	0	0.00%	724	21.61%	3,350
Rosebud	1,608	52.86%	1,337	43.95%	95	3.12%	2	0.07%	271	8.91%	3,042
Sanders	1,178	55.44%	793	37.32%	151	7.11%	3	0.14%	385	18.12%	2,125
Sheridan	3,264	60.86%	1,724	32.15%	371	6.92%	4	0.07%	1,540	28.72%	5,363
Silver Bow	13,084	60.72%	6,757	31.36%	1,563	7.25%	143	0.66%	6,327	29.36%	21,547
Stillwater	1,197	54.78%	918	42.01%	69	3.16%	1	0.05%	279	12.77%	2,185
Sweet Grass	839	47.32%	890	50.20%	44	2.48%	0	0.00%	-51	-2.88%	1,773
Teton	2,273	54.47%	1,603	38.41%	292	7.00%	5	0.12%	670	16.06%	4,173
Toole	1,075	54.51%	698	35.40%	195	9.89%	4	0.20%	377	19.12%	1,972
Valley	2,102	61.07%	1,111	32.28%	222	6.45%	7	0.20%	991	28.79%	3,442
Wibaux	585	52.89%	466	42.13%	55	4.97%	0	0.00%	119	10.76%	1,106
Yellowstone	4,259	54.60%	3,281	42.06%	251	3.22%	10	0.13%	978	12.54%	7,801
Totals	101,063	56.88%	66,750	37.57%	9,564	5.38%	302	0.17%	34,313	19.31%	177,679

== See also ==
- United States presidential elections in Montana
