= 1952 United States presidential election in Montana =

- November 4, 1952

Nominee	Dwight D. Eisenhower	Adlai Stevenson
Party	Republican	Democratic
Home state	New York	Illinois
Running mate	Richard Nixon	John Sparkman
Electoral vote	4	0
Popular vote	157,394	106,213
Percentage	59.39%	40.07%
County results
Eisenhower
50–60%
60–70%
70–80%
Stevenson
40–50%
50–60%
President before election
Harry S. Truman
Democratic
Elected President
Dwight D. Eisenhower
Republican

The 1952 United States presidential election in Montana took place on November 4, 1952, as part of the 1952 United States presidential election. Voters chose four representatives, or electors to the Electoral College, who voted for president and vice president.

Montana voted overwhelmingly for the Republican nominee, war hero General Dwight D. Eisenhower, over the Democratic nominee, Illinois Governor Adlai Stevenson. Eisenhower won Montana by a landslide margin of 19.32%, carrying all counties except four in the mining areas and on the northern border.

== Results ==
1952 United States presidential election in Montana
Party	Candidate	Votes	Percentage	Electoral votes
Republican	Dwight D. Eisenhower	157,394	59.39%	4
Democratic	Adlai Stevenson	106,213	40.07%	0
Progressive	Vincent Hallinan	723	0.27%	0
Prohibition	Stuart Hamblen	548	0.21%	0
Socialist	Darlington Hoopes	159	0.06%	0
Totals		265,037	100.00%	4

=== Results by county ===
County	Dwight D. Eisenhower Republican		Adlai Stevenson Democratic		Various candidates Other parties		Margin		Total votes cast
County	#	%	#	%	#	%	#	%	Total votes cast
Beaverhead	2,196	70.20%	920	29.41%	12	0.38%	1,276	40.79%	3,128
Big Horn	2,165	65.91%	1,114	33.91%	6	0.18%	1,051	32.00%	3,285
Blaine	1,890	60.85%	1,207	38.86%	9	0.29%	683	21.99%	3,106
Broadwater	962	68.86%	435	31.14%	0	0.00%	527	37.72%	1,397
Carbon	2,734	61.16%	1,713	38.32%	23	0.51%	1,021	22.84%	4,470
Carter	921	72.12%	351	27.49%	5	0.39%	570	44.63%	1,277
Cascade	12,176	52.09%	11,051	47.28%	146	0.62%	1,125	4.81%	23,373
Chouteau	2,098	59.35%	1,423	40.25%	14	0.40%	675	19.10%	3,535
Custer	3,461	62.53%	2,050	37.04%	24	0.43%	1,411	25.49%	5,535
Daniels	1,092	62.47%	649	37.13%	7	0.40%	443	25.34%	1,748
Dawson	2,396	65.50%	1,247	34.09%	15	0.41%	1,149	31.41%	3,658
Deer Lodge	3,001	41.58%	4,162	57.67%	54	0.75%	-1,161	-16.09%	7,217
Fallon	1,046	70.01%	440	29.45%	8	0.54%	606	40.56%	1,494
Fergus	4,402	65.79%	2,271	33.94%	18	0.27%	2,131	31.85%	6,691
Flathead	7,372	59.09%	4,994	40.03%	110	0.88%	2,378	19.06%	12,476
Gallatin	6,998	71.93%	2,697	27.72%	34	0.35%	4,301	44.21%	9,729
Garfield	723	72.74%	269	27.06%	2	0.20%	454	45.68%	994
Glacier	2,061	54.68%	1,698	45.05%	10	0.27%	363	9.63%	3,769
Golden Valley	471	70.40%	198	29.60%	0	0.00%	273	40.80%	669
Granite	923	65.88%	473	33.76%	5	0.36%	450	32.12%	1,401
Hill	3,474	55.44%	2,748	43.86%	44	0.70%	726	11.58%	6,266
Jefferson	1,084	60.76%	687	38.51%	13	0.73%	397	22.25%	1,784
Judith Basin	1,074	57.96%	746	40.26%	33	1.78%	328	17.70%	1,853
Lake	3,651	65.09%	1,893	33.75%	65	1.16%	1,758	31.34%	5,609
Lewis and Clark	7,663	62.58%	4,563	37.26%	20	0.16%	3,100	25.32%	12,246
Liberty	671	61.67%	411	37.78%	6	0.55%	260	23.89%	1,088
Lincoln	1,881	49.23%	1,907	49.91%	33	0.86%	-26	-0.68%	3,821
Madison	1,993	72.42%	751	27.29%	8	0.29%	1,242	45.13%	2,752
McCone	900	56.32%	674	42.18%	24	1.50%	226	14.14%	1,598
Meagher	792	70.71%	326	29.11%	2	0.18%	466	41.60%	1,120
Mineral	553	52.47%	491	46.58%	10	0.95%	62	5.89%	1,054
Missoula	10,053	58.99%	6,901	40.50%	87	0.51%	3,152	18.49%	17,041
Musselshell	1,253	50.08%	1,240	49.56%	9	0.36%	13	0.52%	2,502
Park	4,152	67.51%	1,969	32.02%	29	0.47%	2,183	35.49%	6,150
Petroleum	319	67.30%	155	32.70%	0	0.00%	164	34.60%	474
Phillips	1,771	58.70%	1,224	40.57%	22	0.73%	547	18.13%	3,017
Pondera	1,719	57.45%	1,246	41.64%	27	0.90%	473	15.81%	2,992
Powder River	888	72.67%	327	26.76%	7	0.57%	561	45.91%	1,222
Powell	1,783	57.85%	1,281	41.56%	18	0.58%	502	16.29%	3,082
Prairie	771	69.21%	338	30.34%	5	0.45%	433	38.87%	1,114
Ravalli	3,537	66.37%	1,750	32.84%	42	0.79%	1,787	33.53%	5,329
Richland	2,506	67.28%	1,196	32.11%	23	0.62%	1,310	35.17%	3,725
Roosevelt	1,998	57.36%	1,466	42.09%	19	0.55%	532	15.27%	3,483
Rosebud	1,734	67.92%	805	31.53%	14	0.55%	929	36.39%	2,553
Sanders	1,724	56.01%	1,311	42.59%	43	1.40%	413	13.42%	3,078
Sheridan	1,339	49.39%	1,347	49.69%	25	0.92%	-8	-0.30%	2,711
Silver Bow	10,196	43.46%	13,114	55.90%	148	0.63%	-2,918	-12.44%	23,458
Stillwater	1,689	67.02%	816	32.38%	15	0.60%	873	34.64%	2,520
Sweet Grass	1,315	77.17%	372	21.83%	17	1.00%	943	55.34%	1,704
Teton	1,978	58.56%	1,389	41.12%	11	0.33%	589	17.44%	3,378
Toole	1,853	56.25%	1,426	43.29%	15	0.46%	427	12.96%	3,294
Treasure	392	65.66%	205	34.34%	0	0.00%	187	31.32%	597
Valley	2,462	53.28%	2,130	46.09%	29	0.63%	332	7.19%	4,621
Wheatland	1,026	63.85%	572	35.59%	9	0.56%	454	28.26%	1,607
Wibaux	556	62.82%	324	36.61%	5	0.56%	232	26.21%	885
Yellowstone	17,556	66.61%	8,750	33.20%	51	0.19%	8,806	33.41%	26,357
Totals	157,394	59.39%	106,213	40.07%	1,430	0.54%	51,181	19.32%	265,037

==== Counties that flipped from Democratic to Republican ====
- Blaine
- Carbon
- Carter
- Cascade
- Chouteau
- Custer
- Daniels
- Fergus
- Flathead
- Glacier
- Hill
- Jefferson
- Judith Basin
- Liberty
- McCone
- Mineral
- Missoula
- Musselshell
- Petroleum
- Phillips
- Pondera
- Powell
- Prairie
- Richland
- Roosevelt
- Sanders
- Teton
- Toole
- Treasure
- Valley
- Wibaux

== See also ==
- United States presidential elections in Montana
