= 1924 United States presidential election in Montana =

- November 4, 1924

Nominee	Calvin Coolidge	Robert M. La Follette	John W. Davis
Party	Republican	La Follette-Wheeler Independent (Note: The Montana LaFollette vote was the fusion of 61,105 LaFollette-Wheeler Independent, 4,771 Farmer-Labor, and 247 Socialist electors.)	Democratic
Home state	Massachusetts	Wisconsin	West Virginia
Running mate	Charles G. Dawes	Burton K. Wheeler	Charles W. Bryan
Electoral vote	4	0	0
Popular vote	74,138	66,123	33,805
Percentage	42.50%	37.91%	19.38%
County results
Coolidge
30–40%
40–50%
50–60%
La Follette
30–40%
40–50%
50–60%
60–70%
President before election
Calvin Coolidge
Republican
Elected President
Calvin Coolidge
Republican

The 1924 United States presidential election in Montana took place on November 4, 1924, as part of the 1924 United States presidential election. Voters chose four representatives, or electors to the Electoral College, who voted for president and vice president.

Montana voted for the Republican nominee, President Calvin Coolidge, over the liberal third-party candidate Robert M. La Follette who ran locally as a "La Follette-Wheeler Independent" and the Democratic nominee, former United States Ambassador to the United Kingdom John W. Davis. Coolidge won Montana by a margin of 4.59%.

Coolidge was credited for the booming economy while the Democratic electorate was divided between the conservative Davis and the liberal third-party candidate Robert M. La Follette who ran as a Progressive and chose Montana Senator Burton K. Wheeler as his running mate. As of the 2024 presidential election, this is the last election in which Deer Lodge County voted for a Republican presidential candidate.

With 37.91 percent of the popular vote, Montana would prove to be La Follette's fourth strongest state in the 1924 election in terms of popular vote percentage after Wisconsin, North Dakota and Minnesota.

This is the only time a Republican has won the White House without carrying Golden Valley County.

== Results ==
1924 United States presidential election in Montana
Party	Candidate	Votes	Percentage	Electoral votes
Republican	Calvin Coolidge (incumbent)	74,138	42.50%	4
La Follette-Wheeler Independent; Farmer-Labor; Socialist	Robert M. La Follette	66,123	37.91%	0
Democratic	John W. Davis	33,805	19.38%	0
Communist	William Z. Foster	357	0.20%	0
Totals		174,425	100.00%	4

=== Results by county ===
County	John Calvin Coolidge Republican		John William Davis Democratic		Robert M. La Follette La Follette-Wheeler Farmer-Labor Socialist		William Z. Foster Communist		Margin (Note: Because La Follette finished ahead of Davis in Montana as a whole, all margins given are Coolidge vote minus La Follette vote and percentage margins Coolidge percentage minus La Follette percentage unless stated in the total for the county in question.)		Total votes cast
County	#	%	#	%	#	%	#	%	#	%	Total votes cast
Beaverhead	1,386	50.55%	766	27.94%	587	21.41%	3	0.11%	620 (Note: In this county where Davis did run second ahead of La Follette, margin given is Coolidge vote minus Davis vote and percentage margin Coolidge percentage minus Davis percentage.)	22.61%	2,742
Big Horn	1,082	57.74%	327	17.45%	465	24.81%	0	0.00%	617	32.92%	1,874
Blaine	827	45.74%	337	18.64%	642	35.51%	2	0.11%	185	10.23%	1,808
Broadwater	531	37.71%	486	34.52%	390	27.70%	1	0.07%	45	3.20%	1,408
Carbon	1,891	44.33%	698	16.36%	1,648	38.63%	29	0.68%	243	5.70%	4,266
Carter	669	54.17%	283	22.91%	283	22.91%	0	0.00%	386	31.26%	1,235
Cascade	5,081	43.41%	2,220	18.96%	4,373	37.36%	32	0.27%	708	6.05%	11,706
Chouteau	1,347	46.15%	706	24.19%	857	29.36%	9	0.31%	490	16.79%	2,919
Custer	1,654	43.78%	412	10.91%	1,707	45.18%	5	0.13%	-53	-1.40%	3,778
Daniels	505	35.19%	185	12.89%	740	51.57%	5	0.35%	-235	-16.38%	1,435
Dawson	1,326	50.63%	346	13.21%	941	35.93%	6	0.23%	385	14.70%	2,619
Deer Lodge	1,937	35.43%	1,611	29.47%	1,918	35.08%	1	0.02%	19	0.35%	5,467
Fallon	731	55.63%	220	16.74%	363	27.63%	0	0.00%	368	28.01%	1,314
Fergus	2,942	38.50%	1,580	20.68%	3,119	40.81%	1	0.01%	-177	-2.32%	7,642
Flathead	2,541	43.28%	788	13.42%	2,537	43.21%	5	0.09%	4	0.07%	5,871
Gallatin	2,494	44.35%	1,564	27.81%	1,564	27.81%	1	0.02%	930	16.54%	5,623
Garfield	876	50.55%	355	20.48%	502	28.97%	0	0.00%	374	21.58%	1,733
Glacier	586	41.68%	511	36.34%	309	21.98%	0	0.00%	75	5.33%	1,406
Golden Valley	422	37.88%	118	10.59%	573	51.44%	1	0.09%	-151	-13.55%	1,114
Granite	582	43.47%	353	26.36%	402	30.02%	2	0.15%	180	13.44%	1,339
Hill	1,110	30.60%	602	16.59%	1,906	52.54%	10	0.28%	-796	-21.94%	3,628
Jefferson	648	36.49%	434	24.44%	689	38.80%	5	0.28%	-41	-2.31%	1,776
Judith Basin	888	41.34%	480	22.35%	763	35.52%	17	0.79%	125	5.82%	2,148
Lake	884	28.00%	340	10.77%	1,932	61.20%	1	0.03%	-1,048	-33.20%	3,157
Lewis and Clark	3,433	49.93%	1,869	27.19%	1,570	22.84%	3	0.04%	1,564	22.75%	6,875
Liberty	239	33.71%	141	19.89%	329	46.40%	0	0.00%	-90	-12.69%	709
Lincoln	976	40.89%	374	15.67%	1,030	43.15%	7	0.29%	-54	-2.26%	2,387
McCone	494	38.18%	143	11.05%	651	50.31%	6	0.46%	-157	-12.13%	1,294
Madison	1,137	45.85%	672	27.10%	641	25.85%	30	1.21%	465	18.75%	2,480
Meagher	624	59.60%	257	24.55%	166	15.85%	0	0.00%	367	35.05%	1,047
Mineral	223	21.61%	123	11.92%	686	66.47%	0	0.00%	-463	-44.86%	1,032
Missoula	2,386	29.44%	1,012	12.49%	4,704	58.05%	2	0.02%	-2,318	-28.60%	8,104
Musselshell	1,488	45.55%	247	7.56%	1,512	46.28%	20	0.61%	-24	-0.73%	3,267
Park	2,199	50.70%	688	15.86%	1,447	33.36%	3	0.07%	752	17.34%	4,337
Phillips	1,236	46.69%	473	17.87%	935	35.32%	3	0.11%	301	11.37%	2,647
Pondera	764	37.67%	414	20.41%	849	41.86%	1	0.05%	-85	-4.19%	2,028
Powder River	480	48.68%	123	12.47%	380	38.54%	3	0.30%	100	10.14%	986
Powell	982	40.39%	559	22.99%	889	36.57%	1	0.04%	93	3.83%	2,431
Prairie	683	56.21%	162	13.33%	367	30.21%	3	0.25%	316	26.01%	1,215
Ravalli	1,311	37.79%	562	16.20%	1,594	45.95%	2	0.06%	-283	-8.16%	3,469
Richland	926	49.95%	238	12.84%	688	37.11%	2	0.11%	238	12.84%	1,854
Roosevelt	965	39.10%	389	15.76%	1,110	44.98%	4	0.16%	-145	-5.88%	2,468
Rosebud	1,115	49.12%	259	11.41%	893	39.34%	3	0.13%	222	9.78%	2,270
Sanders	588	28.65%	188	9.16%	1,275	62.13%	1	0.05%	-687	-33.48%	2,052
Sheridan	905	35.32%	176	6.87%	1,464	57.14%	17	0.66%	-559	-21.82%	2,562
Silver Bow	6,520	34.66%	5,393	28.66%	6,813	36.21%	88	0.47%	-293	-1.56%	18,814
Stillwater	1,412	59.88%	375	15.90%	567	24.05%	4	0.17%	845	35.84%	2,358
Sweet Grass	853	59.57%	248	17.32%	331	23.11%	0	0.00%	522	36.45%	1,432
Teton	775	40.36%	396	20.63%	746	38.85%	3	0.16%	29	1.51%	1,920
Toole	697	37.49%	439	23.61%	720	38.73%	3	0.16%	-23	-1.24%	1,859
Treasure	289	55.36%	84	16.09%	148	28.35%	1	0.19%	141	27.01%	522
Valley	1,555	51.10%	497	16.33%	986	32.40%	5	0.16%	569	18.70%	3,043
Wheatland	723	44.22%	221	13.52%	691	42.26%	0	0.00%	32	1.96%	1,635
Wibaux	505	56.93%	189	21.31%	191	21.53%	2	0.23%	314	35.40%	887
Yellowstone	4,715	55.91%	1,172	13.90%	2,541	30.13%	5	0.06%	2,174	25.78%	8,433
Totals	74,138	42.50%	33,805	19.38%	66,124	37.91%	358	0.21%	8,014	4.59%	174,425

== See also ==
- United States presidential elections in Montana
