= 1992 United States presidential election in Montana =

- November 3, 1992
- Turnout: 78.9% (▲3.9 pp)

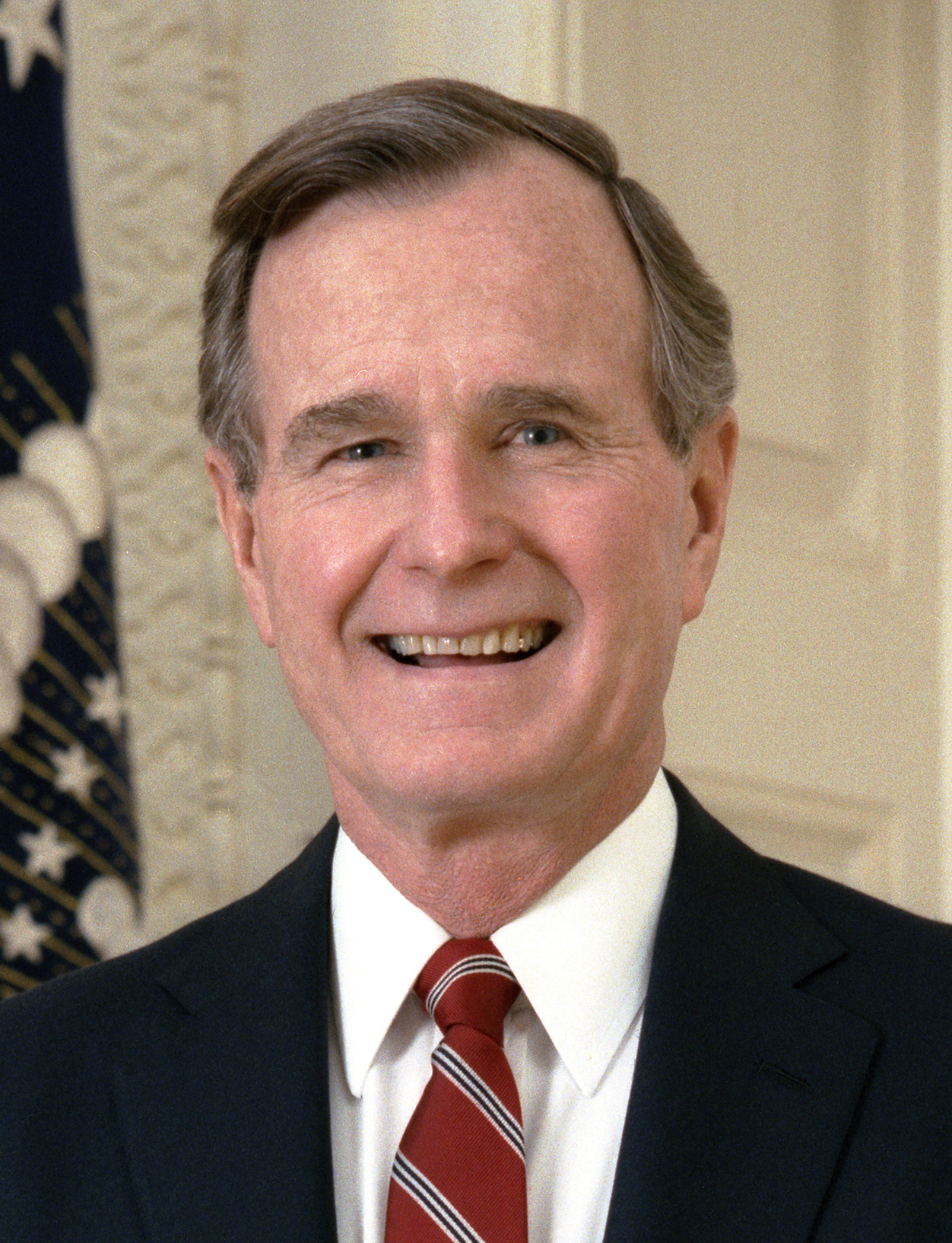

Nominee	Bill Clinton	George H. W. Bush	Ross Perot
Party	Democratic	Republican	Independent
Home state	Arkansas	Texas	Texas
Running mate	Al Gore	Dan Quayle	James Stockdale
Electoral vote	3	0	0
Popular vote	154,507	144,207	107,225
Percentage	37.63%	35.12%	26.12%
County results
Clinton
30–40%
40–50%
50–60%
60–70%
Bush
30–40%
40–50%
50–60%
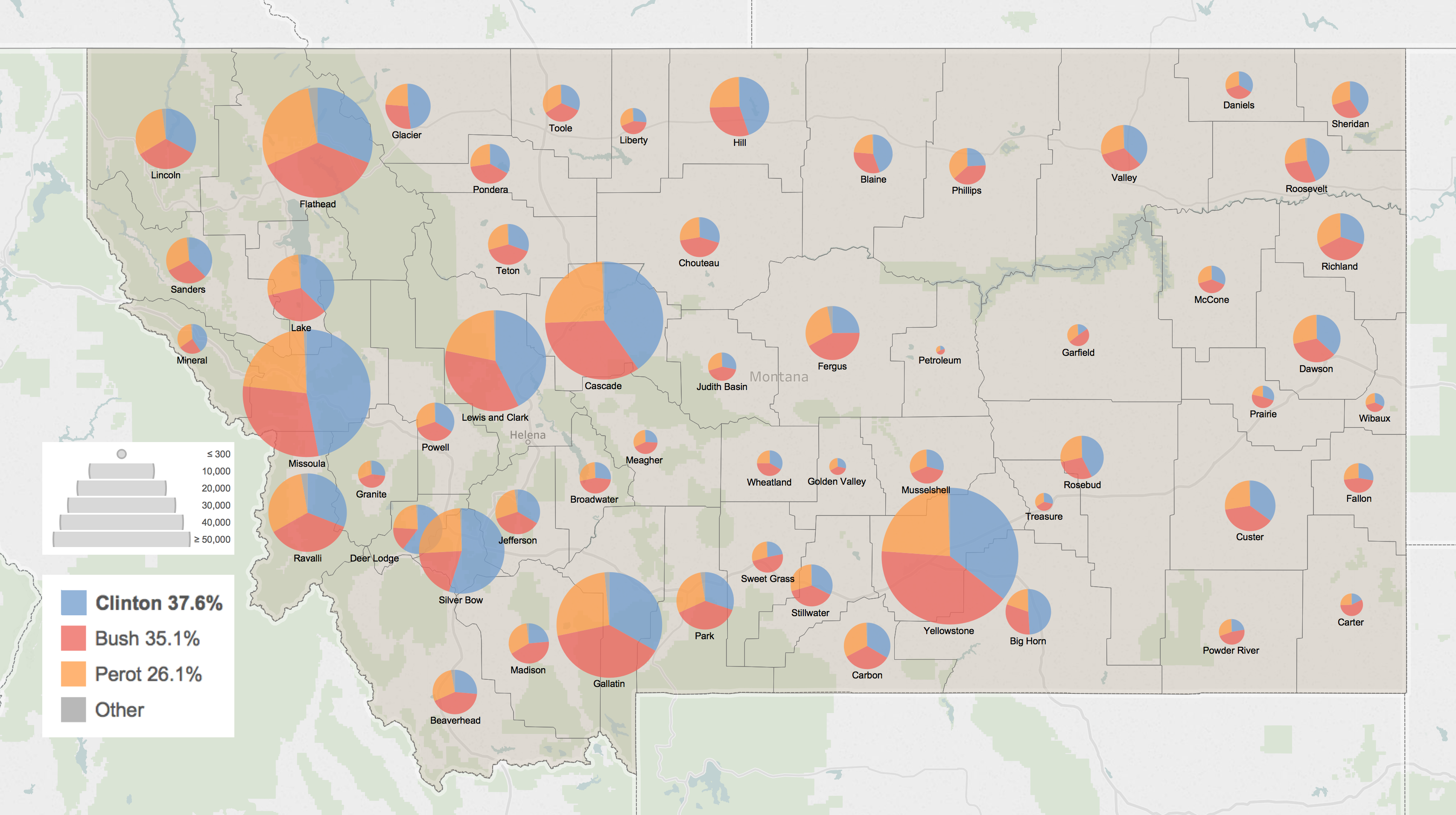
- Results by county showing number of votes by size and candidates by color.
President before election
George H. W. Bush
Republican
Elected President
Bill Clinton
Democratic

The 1992 United States presidential election in Montana was held on November 3, 1992, as part of the 1992 United States presidential election. Voters chose three representatives, or electors to the Electoral College, who voted for president and vice president.

Montana was won by Governor Bill Clinton (D-Arkansas) with a 37.63% plurality of the popular vote over incumbent President George H. W. Bush's (R-Texas) 35.12%, and businessman Ross Perot's (I-Texas) 26.12%. As of 2024, this is the last time Montana voted for the Democratic candidate and is currently the only time a Democratic presidential nominee has carried the state since 1964, setting it apart from its neighboring states (Wyoming, Idaho, North Dakota, and South Dakota), all of which have maintained their Republican streak since 1964. Similarly, this marks the second of two times that Montana has voted for a different candidate than neighboring Idaho, the first being 1892, both states' first election since statehood. This was also one of eight states where Perot earned over 25 percent of the vote.

Since 1964, Montana has only been competitive in a handful of elections: besides this one, the only elections in which a Democrat came within 5% of carrying the state were in the subsequent election, and in Barack Obama's first election in 2008.

== Results ==
1992 United States presidential election in Montana
Party	Candidate	Votes	Percentage	Electoral votes
Democratic	Bill Clinton	154,507	37.63%	3
Republican	George H. W. Bush (incumbent)	144,207	35.12%	0
Independent	Ross Perot	107,225	26.12%	0
America First	James "Bo" Gritz	3,658	0.89%	0
Libertarian	Andre Marrou	986	0.24%	0
Totals		410,583	100.00%	3

=== By county ===
Official results by county from the Montana Secretary of State.

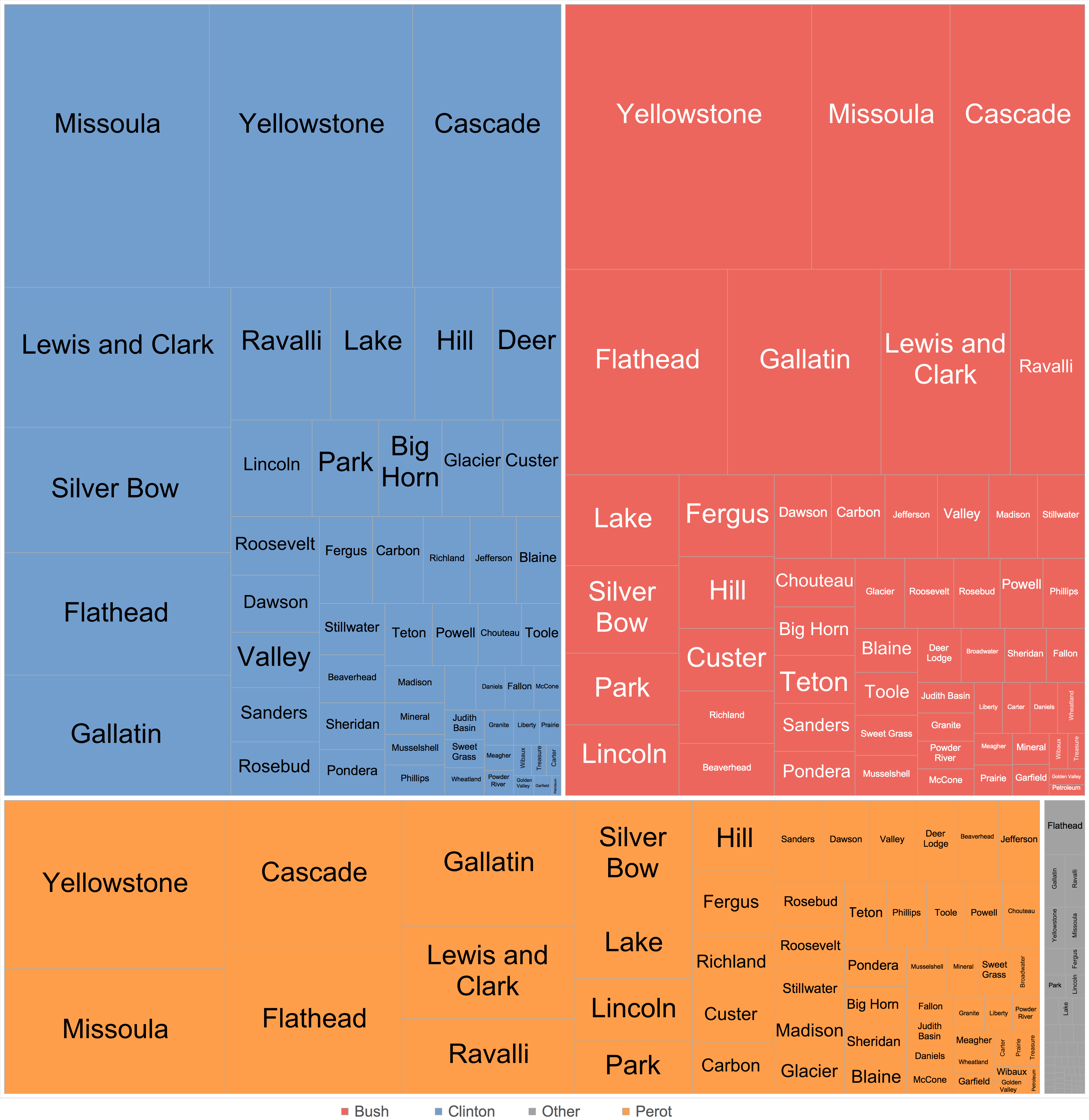
Treemap of the results by county. Color shows candidate and size shows number of votes.

County	Bill Clinton Democratic		George H.W. Bush Republican		Ross Perot Independent		Various candidates Other parties		Margin		Total votes cast
County	#	%	#	%	#	%	#	%	#	%	Total votes cast
Beaverhead	1,098	26.39%	1,746	41.97%	1,202	28.89%	114	2.74%	-544 (Note: In this county where Perot placed second, margin given is difference from Perot vote.)	-13.08%	4,160
Big Horn	2,154	49.02%	1,377	31.34%	840	19.12%	23	0.52%	777	17.68%	4,394
Blaine	1,355	44.48%	971	31.88%	699	22.95%	21	0.69%	384	12.60%	3,046
Broadwater	491	26.66%	830	45.06%	505	27.42%	16	0.87%	-325	-17.64%	1,842
Carbon	1,549	33.53%	1,562	33.81%	1,482	32.08%	27	0.58%	-13	-0.28%	4,620
Carter	154	17.62%	497	56.86%	220	25.17%	3	0.34%	-277	-31.69%	874
Cascade	14,719	40.24%	12,494	34.16%	9,151	25.02%	214	0.59%	2,225	6.08%	36,578
Chouteau	959	29.64%	1,380	42.65%	870	26.89%	27	0.83%	-421	-13.01%	3,236
Custer	1,968	35.07%	2,105	37.52%	1,505	26.82%	33	0.59%	-137	-2.45%	5,611
Daniels	457	33.53%	496	36.39%	402	29.49%	8	0.59%	-39	-2.86%	1,363
Dawson	1,785	36.80%	1,679	34.62%	1,370	28.25%	16	0.33%	106	2.18%	4,850
Deer Lodge	3,174	60.24%	832	15.79%	1,207	22.91%	56	1.06%	1,967	37.33%	5,269
Fallon	446	27.74%	731	45.46%	427	26.55%	4	0.25%	-285	-17.72%	1,608
Fergus	1,615	24.88%	2,736	42.16%	1,934	29.80%	205	3.16%	-802	-12.36%	6,490
Flathead	9,746	31.02%	11,699	37.24%	9,109	28.99%	862	2.74%	-1,953	-6.22%	31,416
Gallatin	9,535	33.13%	11,109	38.60%	7,711	26.79%	424	1.47%	-1,574	-5.47%	28,779
Garfield	125	15.26%	403	49.21%	281	34.31%	10	1.22%	-122	-14.90%	819
Glacier	2,076	48.02%	1,222	28.27%	997	23.06%	28	0.65%	854	19.75%	4,323
Golden Valley	142	28.63%	192	38.71%	157	31.65%	5	1.01%	-35	-7.06%	496
Granite	358	27.08%	556	42.06%	386	29.20%	22	1.66%	-170	-12.86%	1,322
Hill	3,618	44.77%	2,408	29.79%	2,017	24.96%	39	0.48%	1,210	14.98%	8,082
Jefferson	1,415	33.49%	1,541	36.47%	1,172	27.74%	97	2.30%	-126	-2.98%	4,225
Judith Basin	409	28.27%	610	42.16%	415	28.68%	13	0.90%	-195	-13.48%	1,447
Lake	3,938	37.32%	3,596	34.08%	2,878	27.27%	140	1.33%	342	3.24%	10,552
Lewis and Clark	11,117	42.47%	9,351	35.72%	5,560	21.24%	151	0.58%	1,766	6.75%	26,179
Liberty	321	26.51%	512	42.28%	363	29.98%	15	1.24%	-149	-12.30%	1,211
Lincoln	2,765	33.00%	2,799	33.41%	2,637	31.48%	177	2.11%	-34	-0.41%	8,378
Madison	779	23.61%	1,415	42.89%	1,043	31.62%	62	1.88%	-372	-11.27%	3,299
McCone	424	31.31%	528	39.00%	395	29.17%	7	0.52%	-104	-7.69%	1,354
Meagher	260	25.95%	422	42.12%	310	30.94%	10	1.00%	-112	-11.18%	1,002
Mineral	664	40.61%	403	24.65%	543	33.21%	25	1.53%	121	7.40%	1,635
Missoula	20,347	46.99%	12,898	29.79%	9,735	22.48%	319	0.74%	7,449	17.20%	43,299
Musselshell	648	29.08%	876	39.32%	691	31.01%	13	0.58%	-185	-8.31%	2,228
Park	2,258	30.18%	2,846	38.04%	2,182	29.16%	196	2.62%	-588	-7.86%	7,482
Petroleum	61	20.61%	135	45.61%	95	32.09%	5	1.69%	-40	-13.52%	296
Phillips	634	24.15%	1,026	39.09%	949	36.15%	16	0.61%	-77	-2.94%	2,625
Pondera	1,046	33.05%	1,252	39.56%	855	27.01%	12	0.38%	-206	-6.51%	3,165
Powder River	258	22.32%	547	47.32%	340	29.41%	11	0.95%	-207	-17.91%	1,156
Powell	989	33.66%	1,058	36.01%	872	29.68%	19	0.65%	-69	-2.35%	2,938
Prairie	260	30.37%	412	48.13%	179	20.91%	5	0.58%	-152	-17.76%	856
Ravalli	4,644	30.92%	5,392	35.90%	4,573	30.45%	410	2.73%	-748	-4.98%	15,019
Richland	1,440	30.33%	1,760	37.07%	1,525	32.12%	23	0.48%	-235	-4.95%	4,748
Roosevelt	1,827	43.57%	1,212	28.91%	1,089	25.97%	65	1.55%	615	14.66%	4,193
Rosebud	1,669	42.60%	1,130	28.84%	1,099	28.05%	20	0.51%	539	13.76%	3,918
Sanders	1,689	37.48%	1,361	30.20%	1,378	30.58%	78	1.73%	311	6.90%	4,506
Sheridan	1,077	40.44%	795	29.85%	782	29.37%	9	0.34%	282	10.59%	2,663
Silver Bow	9,960	54.89%	3,491	19.24%	4,570	25.18%	125	0.69%	5,390	29.71%	18,146
Stillwater	1,178	32.36%	1,390	38.19%	1,056	29.01%	16	0.44%	-212	-5.83%	3,640
Sweet Grass	395	21.93%	880	48.86%	507	28.15%	19	1.05%	-373	-20.71%	1,801
Teton	1,043	30.63%	1,364	40.06%	969	28.46%	29	0.85%	-321	-9.43%	3,405
Toole	854	31.43%	943	34.71%	903	33.24%	17	0.63%	-40	-1.47%	2,717
Treasure	157	28.70%	206	37.66%	178	32.54%	6	1.10%	-28	-5.12%	547
Valley	1,715	37.54%	1,497	32.77%	1,320	28.90%	36	0.79%	218	4.77%	4,568
Wheatland	384	33.39%	478	41.57%	284	24.70%	4	0.35%	-94	-8.18%	1,150
Wibaux	195	32.13%	234	38.55%	173	28.50%	5	0.82%	-39	-6.42%	607
Yellowstone	20,163	35.72%	22,822	40.43%	13,133	23.26%	332	0.59%	-2,659	-4.71%	56,450
Totals	154,507	37.63%	144,207	35.12%	107,225	26.12%	4,672	1.14%	10,300	2.51%	410,611

==== Counties that flipped from Democratic to Republican ====
- Lincoln

==== Counties that flipped from Republican to Democratic ====
- Cascade
- Dawson
- Lake
- Sanders
- Sheridan
- Valley

== Analysis ==
Montana was won by Governor Bill Clinton (D-Arkansas) with 37.63% of the popular vote over incumbent President George H. W. Bush (R-Texas) with 35.12%. Businessman Ross Perot (I-Texas) finished in third, with 26.12% of the popular vote. It was the first time the state voted for a Democrat since it was won by President Lyndon B. Johnson in 1964. It is also the last time that the state voted Democratic (as of the 2024 presidential election), as well as the last time that Sanders County and Valley County voted Democratic. Clinton became the first-ever Democrat to win the White House without carrying Lincoln or McCone Counties, as well as the first since Franklin D. Roosevelt in 1944 to win without carrying Wibaux County.

== See also ==
- United States presidential elections in Montana
- Presidency of Bill Clinton
