= Butchertown =

Butchertown may refer to:

- Butchertown, Casey County, Kentucky
- Butchertown, Louisville, Kentucky
- Butchertown, a historical neighborhood in what is today Bayview–Hunters Point, San Francisco
- Butchertown, a neighborhood in Walkerville, Montana
