= Deer Lodge County, Montana =

County in Montana, United States

Deer Lodge County
- Consolidated city-county
- Anaconda-Deer Lodge
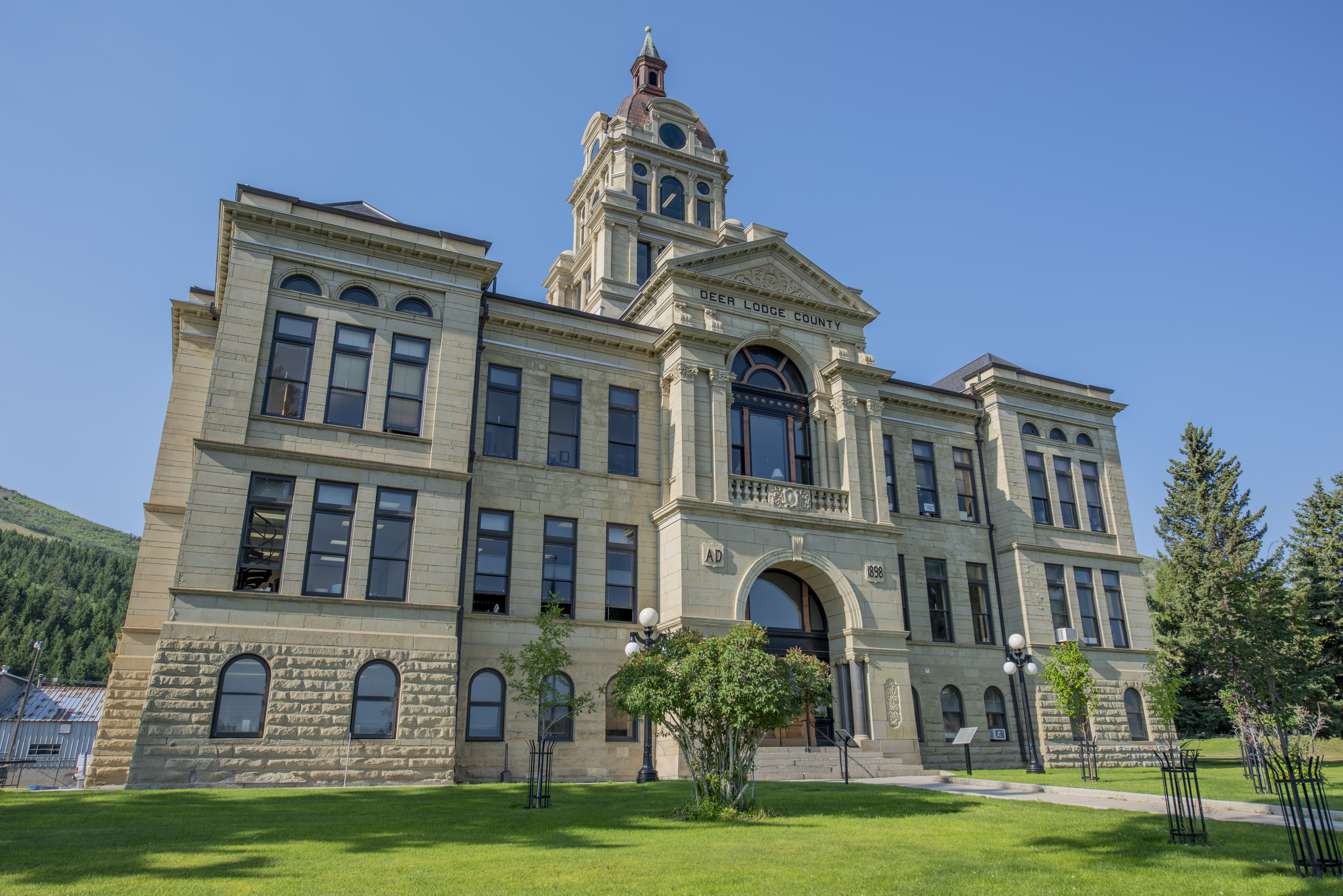
- Deer Lodge County Courthouse

- Location within the U.S. state of Montana
- Coordinates: 46°07′14″N 112°59′15″W
- Country: United States
- State: Montana
- Founded: 1865
- Seat: Anaconda
- Largest city: Anaconda

Government
  - Chief Executive: Bill T. Everett

Area
  - Total: 741 sq mi (1,920 km^{2})
  - Land: 737 sq mi (1,910 km^{2})
  - Water: 4.7 sq mi (12 km^{2}) 0.6%

Population (2020)
  - Total: 9,421
  - Estimate (2025): 9,709 ▲
  - Density: 12.8/sq mi (4.94/km^{2})
- Time zone: UTC−7 (Mountain)
  - Summer (DST): UTC−6 (MDT)
- Congressional district: 1st
- Website: adlc.us
- Montana county number 30; Consolidated with Anaconda, MT

Deer Lodge County is a county in the U.S. state of Montana. As of the 2020 census, the population was 9,421. It forms a consolidated city-county government with its county seat of Anaconda. The county was established in 1865. It has had a consolidated city-county government since 1977.

== History ==
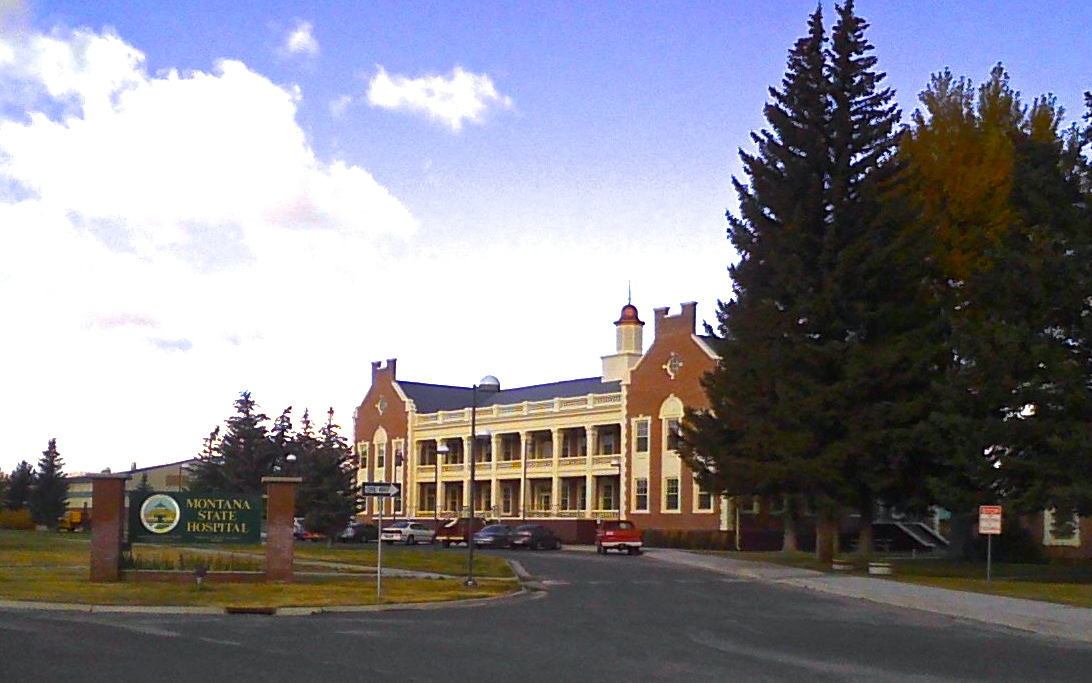
Warm Springs State Hospital

Deer Lodge was one of the original 9 Montana counties, as constituted with the establishment of the Montana Territory in 1864. The original county included what are now Silver Bow County (separated in 1881), Deer Lodge County, Granite County (separated in 1893) and Powell County (separated in 1901). In 1976, the voters chose a consolidated city-county form of government in the general election, and the charter became effective January 1, 1977.

== Geography ==
According to the United States Census Bureau, the county has an area of 741 square miles (1,920 km^{2}), of which 737 square miles (1,910 km^{2}) is land and 4.7 square miles (12 km^{2}) (0.6%) is water. It is the second-smallest county in Montana by area.

The county has a wealth of natural amenities, such as the Anaconda Mountain Range, Georgetown Lake, and the Mount Haggin wildlife management area (Montana's largest at 54,000 acres).

=== Major highways ===
- Interstate 90
- U.S. Highway 10 (Former)
- Montana Highway 1
- Montana Highway 43
- Montana Highway 48

=== Adjacent counties ===
- Granite County - northwest
- Powell County - north
- Jefferson County - east
- Silver Bow County - southeast
- Beaverhead County - south
- Ravalli County - west

=== National protected areas ===
- Beaverhead National Forest (part)
- Deerlodge National Forest (part)

== Demographics ==
Historical population
Census	Pop.	Note	%±
1870	4,367		—
1880	8,876		103.3%
1890	15,155		70.7%
1900	17,393		14.8%
1910	12,988		−25.3%
1920	15,323		18.0%
1930	16,293		6.3%
1940	13,627		−16.4%
1950	16,553		21.5%
1960	18,640		12.6%
1970	15,652		−16.0%
1980	12,518		−20.0%
1990	10,278		−17.9%
2000	9,417		−8.4%
2010	9,298		−1.3%
2020	9,421		1.3%
2025 (est.)	9,709	▲	3.1%
U.S. Decennial Census; 1790–1960, 1900–1990, 1990–2000, 2010–2020

=== 2020 census ===
As of the 2020 census, the county had a population of 9,421. Of the residents, 16.7% were under the age of 18 and 25.5% were 65 years of age or older; the median age was 49.4 years. For every 100 females there were 109.8 males, and for every 100 females age 18 and over there were 111.2 males. 71.1% of residents lived in urban areas and 28.9% lived in rural areas.

The racial makeup of the county was 91.7% White, 0.2% Black or African American, 2.5% American Indian and Alaska Native, 0.4% Asian, 0.5% from some other race, and 4.6% from two or more races. Hispanic or Latino residents of any race comprised 2.8% of the population.

There were 4,284 households in the county, of which 20.8% had children under the age of 18 living with them and 27.4% had a female householder with no spouse or partner present. About 38.3% of all households were made up of individuals and 18.0% had someone living alone who was 65 years of age or older.

There were 5,493 housing units, of which 22.0% were vacant. Among occupied housing units, 70.8% were owner-occupied and 29.2% were renter-occupied. The homeowner vacancy rate was 1.8% and the rental vacancy rate was 13.5%.

=== 2010 census ===
As of the 2010 census, there were 9,298 people, 4,018 households, and 2,350 families living in the county. The population density was 12.6 inhabitants per square mile (4.9/km^{2}). There were 5,122 housing units at an average density of 7.0 units per square mile (2.7 units/km^{2}). The racial makeup of the county was 93.1% white, 3.1% American Indian, 0.4% black or African American, 0.3% Asian, 0.5% from other races, and 2.5% from two or more races. Those of Hispanic or Latino origin made up 2.9% of the population. In terms of ancestry, 30.2% were German, 26.2% were Irish, 9.2% were English, 8.5% were Norwegian, 5.9% were Italian, 5.2% were Swedish, and 2.6% were American.

Of the 4,018 households, 22.3% had children under the age of 18 living with them, 44.8% were married couples living together, 9.2% had a female householder with no husband present, 41.5% were non-families, and 36.1% of all households were made up of individuals. The average household size was 2.11 and the average family size was 2.73. The median age was 46.0 years.

The median income for a household in the county was $35,310 and the median income for a family was $51,076. Males had a median income of $32,477 versus $26,250 for females. The per capita income for the county was $21,921. About 9.6% of families and 21.2% of the population were below the poverty line, including 30.6% of those under age 18 and 6.9% of those age 65 or over.

== Government and politics ==
Along with neighboring Silver Bow county, Anaconda-Deer Lodge has been a consolidated city-county since 1977, the only two in Montana. The incumbent chief executive officer of Anaconda-Deer Lodge is Bill Everett, who was elected in 2017.

Deer Lodge County is the most consistently Democratic county in Montana when it comes to presidential elections. It has not supported a Republican candidate since Calvin Coolidge in 1924. In 2016, Hillary Clinton failed to garner a majority of the votes, becoming the first Democrat not to obtain a majority since 1924. In 2020, the county once again gave the Democratic candidate (Joe Biden) the majority, when he won 52% of the vote. However, in 2024, Kamala Harris carried the county by only 47 votes, or less than 1%, winning a plurality of 48.79%. This was an even narrower edge than in 2016; Donald Trump's performance in this election was the best by a Republican in the county since 1956. In gubernatorial elections the most recent Republican to carry the county was Marc Racicot in the 1996 election. In that election the original Democratic nominee, Chet Blaylock, died and Marc Racicot carried every county.

Deer Lodge County is currently in the 39th district of the Montana Senate along with Granite County and portions of Powell and Silver Bow counties. It has been represented by Republican Terry Vermeire since 2023, having flipped the traditionally Democratic seat by a 752 vote margin. Vermeire defeated Democrat Jesse Mullen, executive of the Mullen Newspaper Company from Deer Lodge (city) in the 2022 special election. Jessica Wicks, Democratic incumbent appointed to fulfill Mark Sweeney's term following his May 2022 death, did not win appointment from the local Democratic Party to be their November nominee.

In the Montana House of Representatives, most of the county is in the 77th district and has been represented by Republican John Fitzpatrick since 2023, who won an upset against incumbent Democrat Sara Novak by a margin of 47. This marks the first time since 1945 that Anaconda has been represented by a Republican in the state House of Representatives. Part of the county is also in the 78th district, represented by Republican Gregory Frazer.

From 2024 to 2033, Deer Lodge County will be in House District 71 (along with Walkerville) and Senate District 36 (along with Walkerville and part of Butte). These districts are expected to be more Democratic than the current districts used since 2014.

United States presidential election results for Deer Lodge County, Montana
Year	Republican		Democratic		Third party(ies)	
Year	No.	%	No.	%	No.	%
1892	1,930	35.47%	2,152	39.55%	1,359	24.98%
1896	446	8.31%	4,916	91.55%	8	0.15%
1900	1,636	31.50%	3,395	65.38%	162	3.12%
1904	1,666	48.64%	1,504	43.91%	255	7.45%
1908	1,377	43.67%	1,611	51.09%	165	5.23%
1912	1,060	37.06%	1,197	41.85%	603	21.08%
1916	1,860	30.28%	4,171	67.90%	112	1.82%
1920	3,130	59.97%	1,567	30.02%	522	10.00%
1924	1,937	35.43%	1,611	29.47%	1,919	35.10%
1928	2,695	45.67%	3,184	53.96%	22	0.37%
1932	2,198	35.43%	3,893	62.75%	113	1.82%
1936	1,640	25.04%	4,813	73.49%	96	1.47%
1940	2,397	32.63%	4,916	66.93%	32	0.44%
1944	2,176	33.19%	4,347	66.31%	33	0.50%
1948	2,036	32.78%	3,862	62.17%	314	5.05%
1952	3,001	41.58%	4,162	57.67%	54	0.75%
1956	3,551	48.36%	3,792	51.64%	0	0.00%
1960	2,188	29.79%	5,149	70.11%	7	0.10%
1964	1,415	22.61%	4,835	77.25%	9	0.14%
1968	1,554	25.58%	4,208	69.28%	312	5.14%
1972	2,373	35.93%	3,979	60.25%	252	3.82%
1976	2,197	35.57%	3,859	62.48%	120	1.94%
1980	1,905	33.79%	3,077	54.58%	656	11.64%
1984	1,901	34.53%	3,539	64.29%	65	1.18%
1988	1,168	26.51%	3,185	72.29%	53	1.20%
1992	832	15.79%	3,174	60.24%	1,263	23.97%
1996	883	17.62%	3,331	66.49%	796	15.89%
2000	1,493	32.93%	2,672	58.93%	369	8.14%
2004	1,725	37.97%	2,700	59.43%	118	2.60%
2008	1,502	29.60%	3,402	67.05%	170	3.35%
2012	1,448	32.47%	2,860	64.13%	152	3.41%
2016	1,763	41.92%	2,058	48.93%	385	9.15%
2020	2,186	44.69%	2,562	52.38%	143	2.92%
2024	2,329	47.82%	2,376	48.79%	165	3.39%

== Communities ==
=== City ===
- Anaconda

=== Unincorporated communities ===
- Galen
- Georgetown
- Opportunity
- Warm Springs

Note: the town of Deer Lodge is in neighboring Powell County.

== Notable people ==
- Lucille Ball – actress and television star, most notably on I Love Lucy
- John H. Collins – classical scholar.
- Frank Cope – New York Giants offensive lineman
- Marcus Daly – founder of Anaconda, and one of the "Copper Kings" of Butte.
- Wayne Estes – college basketball star
- Raymond Hunthausen – Archbishop of Seattle
- Rob Johnson – San Diego Padres catcher
- Nancy Keenan – politician, NARAL president
- George A. Lingo – politician in the Alaska Territory
- Roger Rouse – Professional Boxer
- George Leo Thomas – Roman Catholic Bishop of Helena
- Lester Thurow – economist
- John H. Tolan – later a United States Congressman from California, was an attorney of the county from 1904 through 1906.

== See also ==
- Atlantic Cable Quartz Lode
- List of lakes in Deer Lodge County, Montana
- List of mountains in Deer Lodge County, Montana
- National Register of Historic Places listings in Deer Lodge County, Montana

== Sources ==
- Powell County Museum and Arts Foundation: Historic Action Committee (1989). Powell County: Where It All Began. Powell County Museum and Arts Foundation.
