= Silver Bow County, Montana =

County in Montana, United States

Silver Bow County
- Consolidated city-county
- Butte-Silver Bow
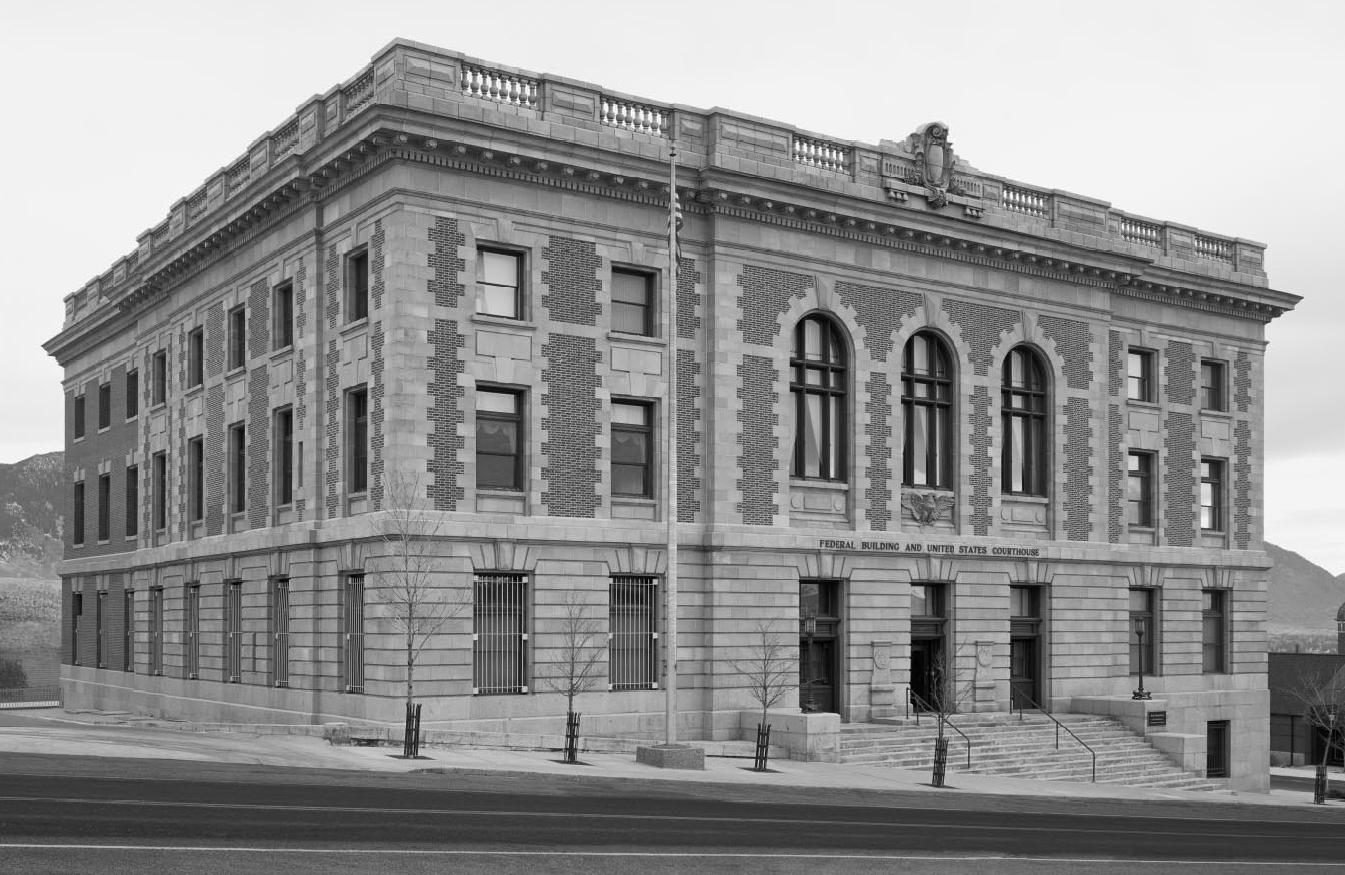
- Mike Mansfield Federal Building and United States Courthouse in Butte.

- Location within the U.S. state of Montana
- Coordinates: 45°54′N 112°40′W
- Country: United States
- State: Montana
- Founded: February 16, 1881
- Named for: Silver Bow Creek
- Seat: Butte
- Largest city: Butte

Government
  - Chief Executive: J.P. Gallagher

Area
  - Total: 719 sq mi (1,860 km^{2})
  - Land: 718 sq mi (1,860 km^{2})
  - Water: 0.6 sq mi (1.6 km^{2}) 0.08%

Population (2020)
  - Total: 35,133
  - Estimate (2025): 36,118 ▲
  - Density: 48.9/sq mi (18.9/km^{2})
- Time zone: UTC−7 (Mountain)
  - Summer (DST): UTC−6 (MDT)
- Congressional district: 1st
- Website: co.silverbow.mt.us
- Montana county number 01; Consolidated with Butte, MT

Silver Bow County is a county in the U.S. state of Montana. As of the 2020 census, the population was 35,133. Its county seat is Butte. In 1977, the city and county governments consolidated to form the single entity of Butte-Silver Bow. Additionally, the town of Walkerville is a separate municipality from Butte and is within the county.

Silver Bow County comprises the Butte-Silver Bow, MT Micropolitan Statistical Area.

== Geography ==
According to the United States Census Bureau, the county has an area of 719 square miles (1,860 km^{2}), of which 718 square miles (1,860 km^{2}) is land and 0.6 square miles (1.6 km^{2}) (0.08%) is water. It is Montana's smallest county by area.

=== Major highways ===
- Interstate 15
- Interstate 90
- Interstate 115
- U.S. Highway 10 (Former)
- U.S. Highway 91 (Former)
- Montana Highway 2
- Montana Highway 41
- Montana Highway 43
- Montana Highway 55

=== Transit ===
- Jefferson Lines
- Salt Lake Express

=== Adjacent counties ===
- Deer Lodge County - northwest
- Jefferson County - east
- Madison County - south
- Beaverhead County - southwest

=== National protected areas ===
Beaverhead–Deerlodge National Forest (part)

== Demographics ==
Historical population
Census	Pop.	Note	%±
1890	23,744		—
1900	47,635		100.6%
1910	56,848		19.3%
1920	60,313		6.1%
1930	56,969		−5.5%
1940	53,209		−6.6%
1950	48,422		−9.0%
1960	46,454		−4.1%
1970	41,981		−9.6%
1980	38,092		−9.3%
1990	33,941		−10.9%
2000	34,606		2.0%
2010	34,200		−1.2%
2020	35,133		2.7%
2025 (est.)	36,118	▲	2.8%
U.S. Decennial Census; 1790–1960, 1900–1990, 1990–2000, 2010–2020

=== 2020 census ===
As of the 2020 census, the county had a population of 35,133; 20.0% of residents were under the age of 18 and 20.6% were 65 years of age or older, and the median age was 41.8 years. For every 100 females there were 103.0 males, and for every 100 females age 18 and over there were 101.5 males. 86.1% of residents lived in urban areas and 13.9% lived in rural areas.

Silver Bow County, Montana – Racial composition Note: the US Census treats Hispanic/Latino as an ethnic category. This table excludes Latinos from the racial categories and assigns them to a separate category. Hispanics/Latinos may be of any race.
Race (NH = Non-Hispanic)	% 2020	% 2010	% 2000	Pop 2020	Pop 2010	Pop 2000
White alone (NH)	88.5%	92.1%	93.7%	31,081	31,515	32,410
Black alone (NH)	0.4%	0.3%	0.1%	126	103	45
American Indian alone (NH)	1.4%	1.7%	1.8%	480	587	619
Asian alone (NH)	0.6%	0.5%	0.4%	214	161	147
Pacific Islander alone (NH)	0.1%	0.1%	0.1%	20	22	20
Other race alone (NH)	0.4%	0%	0.1%	134	13	18
Multiracial (NH)	4.1%	1.6%	1.1%	1,440	546	397
Hispanic/Latino (any race)	4.7%	3.7%	2.7%	1,638	1,253	950

The racial makeup of the county was 90.5% White, 0.4% Black or African American, 1.6% American Indian and Alaska Native, 0.6% Asian, 1.0% from some other race, and 5.9% from two or more races. Hispanic or Latino residents of any race comprised 4.7% of the population.

There were 15,450 households in the county, of which 23.9% had children under the age of 18 living with them and 27.9% had a female householder with no spouse or partner present. About 36.4% of all households were made up of individuals and 15.6% had someone living alone who was 65 years of age or older.

There were 17,247 housing units, of which 10.4% were vacant. Among occupied housing units, 65.7% were owner-occupied and 34.3% were renter-occupied. The homeowner vacancy rate was 1.7% and the rental vacancy rate was 11.2%.

The most reported ancestries in 2020 were:

- Irish (28.4%)
- German (19.2%)
- English (19.2%)
- Italian (6%)
- Norwegian (4.3%)
- Scottish (3.8%)
- French (3.4%)
- Mexican (3.2%)
- Swedish (2.6%)
- Finnish (2%)

=== 2010 census ===
As of the 2010 census, there were 34,200 people, 14,932 households, and 8,651 families living in the county. The population density was 47.6 inhabitants per square mile (18.4/km^{2}). There were 16,717 housing units at an average density of 23.3 per square mile (9.0/km^{2}). The racial makeup of the county was 94.4% white, 1.9% American Indian, 0.5% Asian, 0.3% black or African American, 0.1% Pacific islander, 0.7% from other races, and 2.1% from two or more races. Those of Hispanic or Latino origin made up 3.7% of the population. In terms of ancestry, 32.6% were Irish, 23.3% were German, 16.1% were English, 8.3% were Italian, 6.9% were Norwegian, and 3.2% were American.

Of the 14,932 households, 26.0% had children under the age of 18 living with them, 42.2% were married couples living together, 10.6% had a female householder with no husband present, 42.1% were non-families, and 35.1% of all households were made up of individuals. The average household size was 2.22 and the average family size was 2.87. The median age was 41.3 years.

The median income for a household in the county was $37,986 and the median income for a family was $52,288. Males had a median income of $41,491 versus $28,132 for females. The per capita income for the county was $21,357. About 11.6% of families and 17.8% of the population were below the poverty line, including 23.1% of those under age 18 and 8.9% of those age 65 or over.

== Government and politics ==
Since 1977, Butte and Silver Bow County have been consolidated into one governmental body under the leadership of the chief executive and the council of commissioners. Elected in November 2020, J.P. Gallagher is the incumbent Chief Executive of Butte-Silver Bow, a nonpartisan office.

A Democratic bastion, Silver Bow County is, along with neighboring Deer Lodge County, one of the two most consistently Democratic-voting counties in Montana in presidential elections, having last voted Republican in 1956 for Dwight D. Eisenhower. In 2024, Donald Trump, though still losing the county, became the first Republican to get within ten percent of carrying it since the aforementioned 1956 election.

Over the last century, Silver Bow County has voted only once for a Republican gubernatorial candidate (Marc Racicot during the 1996 election). Silver Bow County has not supported any Republican at all for the U.S. Senate since at least 1928.

Silver Bow County is in Montana Senate districts 36 (represented by Republican Jeffrey Welborn), 37 (represented by Democrat Ryan Lynch), 38 (represented by Democrat Edith McClafferty), and 39 (represented by Republican Terry Vermeire). In the Montana House of Representatives, the county is in districts 71 (represented by Republican Kenneth Walsh), 72 (represented by Republican Tom Welch), 73 (represented by Democrat Jennifer Lynch), 74 (represented by Democrat Derek J. Harvey), 76 (represented by Democrat Donavon Hawk), and 78 (represented by Republican Gregory Frazer).

From 2024 to 2032, Silver Bow County will be in State Senate districts 35, 36, and 37, as well as State House of Representatives districts 70, 71, 72, 73, and 74. Two of the three Senate districts are expected to be favorable to Democrats as well as four of the five House districts.

United States presidential election results for Silver Bow County, Montana
Year	Republican		Democratic		Third party(ies)	
Year	No.	%	No.	%	No.	%
1892	3,251	38.58%	2,648	31.43%	2,527	29.99%
1896	1,275	11.29%	9,992	88.46%	29	0.26%
1900	3,873	23.75%	12,101	74.19%	336	2.06%
1904	5,149	36.07%	5,686	39.83%	3,439	24.09%
1908	4,618	33.82%	6,255	45.80%	2,783	20.38%
1912	2,232	18.76%	4,542	38.18%	5,122	43.06%
1916	6,757	31.36%	13,084	60.72%	1,706	7.92%
1920	10,074	55.36%	6,394	35.14%	1,730	9.51%
1924	6,520	34.66%	5,393	28.66%	6,901	36.68%
1928	9,456	44.81%	11,228	53.21%	419	1.99%
1932	6,792	31.11%	13,626	62.41%	1,416	6.49%
1936	4,528	20.02%	17,697	78.23%	398	1.76%
1940	7,932	30.82%	17,467	67.88%	335	1.30%
1944	7,610	36.17%	13,228	62.87%	202	0.96%
1948	7,305	34.24%	12,715	59.60%	1,315	6.16%
1952	10,196	43.46%	13,114	55.90%	148	0.63%
1956	11,619	50.31%	11,475	49.69%	0	0.00%
1960	7,290	34.40%	13,754	64.91%	146	0.69%
1964	4,873	22.94%	15,751	74.16%	615	2.90%
1968	5,488	27.98%	12,626	64.36%	1,503	7.66%
1972	7,967	39.05%	11,704	57.36%	733	3.59%
1976	7,506	39.28%	11,377	59.53%	227	1.19%
1980	7,301	37.68%	9,721	50.17%	2,355	12.15%
1984	6,637	36.85%	11,095	61.60%	278	1.54%
1988	5,043	30.22%	11,422	68.45%	222	1.33%
1992	3,491	19.24%	9,960	54.89%	4,695	25.87%
1996	3,909	22.11%	11,199	63.35%	2,569	14.53%
2000	6,299	37.71%	8,967	53.68%	1,437	8.60%
2004	6,381	39.67%	9,307	57.86%	396	2.46%
2008	4,818	28.27%	11,676	68.51%	548	3.22%
2012	5,430	32.41%	10,857	64.79%	469	2.80%
2016	6,376	38.76%	8,619	52.39%	1,457	8.86%
2020	7,745	41.51%	10,392	55.70%	521	2.79%
2024	8,110	44.50%	9,386	51.50%	730	4.01%

== Communities ==
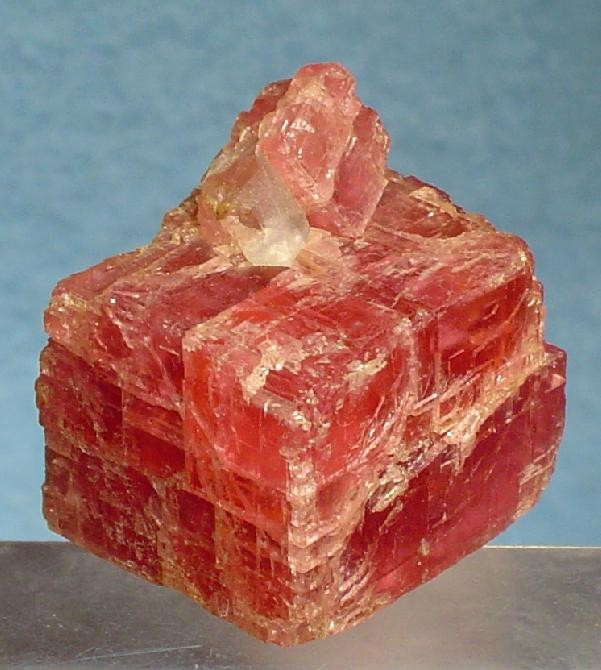
Rhodochrosite from the old Emma Mine in the Butte Mining District

=== City ===
- Butte (county seat)

=== Town ===
- Walkerville

=== Unincorporated communities ===
- Divide
- High View
- Melrose
- Ramsay
- Rocker
- Silver Bow
- Williamsburg

== Education ==
Butte Public Schools has two components: Butte Elementary School District and Butte High School District. Whitehall Public Schools has two components: Whitehall Elementary School District and Whitehall High School District.

The consolidated city-county is covered by multiple school districts. High school districts include Butte High School District and Whitehall High School District. There are five elementary school districts: Butte Elementary School District, Divide Elementary School District, Melrose Elementary School District, Ramsay Elementary School District, and Whitehall Elementary School District.

== See also ==
- List of lakes in Silver Bow County, Montana
- List of mountains in Silver Bow County, Montana
- National Register of Historic Places listings in Silver Bow County, Montana
