= Storm Lake =

Storm Lake may refer to:

== Places ==
- Storm Lake, Iowa

== Lakes ==
- Storm Lake (Colorado), a lake in Boulder County, Colorado
- Little Storm Lake (Colorado), a lake in Boulder County, Colorado
- Storm Lake (Idaho), a lake in Idaho County, Idaho
- Storm Peak Lake, a lake in Valley County, Idaho
- Storm Lake (Iowa), a lake in Buena Vista County, Iowa
- Little Storm Lake (Iowa), a small lake in Buena Vista County, Iowa
- Storm Lake (Minnesota), a lake in Blue Earth County, Minnesota
- Storm Lake, a lake in Stillwater County, Montana
- Storm Lake in Deer Lodge County, Montana
- Red Storm Lake, a lake in Carbon County, Montana
- Storm Lake (North Dakota), a lake in Sargent County, North Dakota
- Storm Lake (Oregon), a lake in Klamath County, Oregon
- Little Storm Lake (Oregon), a lake in Wallowa County, Oregon
- Storm Lake (Washington), a lake in Snohomish County, Washington
- Storm Lake (Wisconsin), a lake in Waupaca County, Wisconsin
