= 1976 United States presidential election in Montana =

- November 2, 1976

Nominee	Gerald Ford	Jimmy Carter
Party	Republican	Democratic
Home state	Michigan	Georgia
Running mate	Bob Dole	Walter Mondale
Electoral vote	4	0
Popular vote	173,703	149,259
Percentage	52.84%	45.40%
County results
Ford
40–50%
50–60%
60–70%
Carter
40–50%
50–60%
60–70%
President before election
Gerald Ford
Republican
Elected President
Jimmy Carter
Democratic

The 1976 United States presidential election in Montana was part of the 1976 United States presidential election, which took place on November 2, 1976. Voters chose four representatives, or electors to the Electoral College, who voted for president and vice president.

Montana voted for the Republican nominee, President Gerald Ford, over the Democratic nominee, former Georgia Governor Jimmy Carter. Ford won Montana by a margin of 7.44%. As of the 2024 presidential election, this is the last election in which McCone County and Wibaux County voted for a Democratic presidential candidate. Carter became the first ever Democrat to win the White House without carrying Daniels, Judith Basin, Pondera, Teton, or Toole Counties, as well as the first to do so without carrying Cascade County since Grover Cleveland in 1892, and the first to do so without carrying Chouteau or Valley Counties since Woodrow Wilson in 1912.

== Results ==
1976 United States presidential election in Montana
Party	Candidate	Votes	Percentage	Electoral votes
Republican	Gerald Ford (incumbent)	173,703	52.84%	4
Democratic	Jimmy Carter	149,259	45.40%	0
Americanist	Thomas J. Anderson	5,772	1.76%	0
Totals		328,734	100.00%	4

=== Results by county ===
County	Gerald Ford Republican		Jimmy Carter Democratic		Thomas Anderson Americanist		Margin		Total votes cast
County	#	%	#	%	#	%	#	%	Total votes cast
Beaverhead	2,461	69.46%	1,013	28.59%	69	1.95%	1,448	40.87%	3,543
Big Horn	1,615	44.49%	1,962	54.05%	53	1.46%	-347	-9.56%	3,630
Blaine	1,349	49.25%	1,356	49.51%	34	1.24%	-7	-0.26%	2,739
Broadwater	820	59.04%	557	40.10%	12	0.86%	263	18.94%	1,389
Carbon	2,121	52.44%	1,853	45.81%	71	1.76%	268	6.63%	4,045
Carter	558	57.41%	344	35.39%	70	7.20%	214	22.02%	972
Cascade	15,289	50.11%	14,678	48.11%	544	1.78%	611	2.00%	30,511
Chouteau	1,814	52.35%	1,568	45.25%	83	2.40%	246	7.10%	3,465
Custer	3,120	55.25%	2,425	42.94%	102	1.81%	695	12.31%	5,647
Daniels	816	49.79%	797	48.63%	26	1.59%	19	1.16%	1,639
Dawson	2,639	53.21%	2,201	44.38%	120	2.42%	438	8.83%	4,960
Deer Lodge	2,197	35.57%	3,859	62.48%	120	1.94%	-1,662	-26.91%	6,176
Fallon	934	51.98%	847	47.13%	16	0.89%	87	4.85%	1,797
Fergus	3,556	57.73%	2,470	40.10%	134	2.18%	1,086	17.63%	6,160
Flathead	10,494	55.69%	7,827	41.53%	524	2.78%	2,667	14.16%	18,845
Gallatin	11,062	63.36%	6,215	35.60%	183	1.05%	4,847	27.76%	17,460
Garfield	625	67.79%	273	29.61%	24	2.60%	352	38.18%	922
Glacier	1,892	50.81%	1,755	47.13%	77	2.07%	137	3.68%	3,724
Golden Valley	302	53.08%	255	44.82%	12	2.11%	47	8.26%	569
Granite	746	58.65%	509	40.02%	17	1.34%	237	18.63%	1,272
Hill	3,274	45.10%	3,878	53.42%	108	1.49%	-604	-8.32%	7,260
Jefferson	1,387	52.26%	1,210	45.59%	57	2.15%	177	6.67%	2,654
Judith Basin	809	50.12%	772	47.83%	33	2.04%	37	2.29%	1,614
Lake	3,809	52.83%	3,253	45.12%	148	2.05%	556	7.71%	7,210
Lewis and Clark	10,155	54.84%	8,118	43.84%	244	1.32%	2,037	11.00%	18,517
Liberty	638	54.86%	506	43.51%	19	1.63%	132	11.35%	1,163
Lincoln	3,017	48.02%	3,146	50.07%	120	1.91%	-129	-2.05%	6,283
McCone	730	48.70%	749	49.97%	20	1.33%	-19	-1.27%	1,499
Madison	1,688	64.67%	870	33.33%	52	1.99%	818	31.34%	2,610
Meagher	565	60.17%	364	38.76%	10	1.06%	201	21.41%	939
Mineral	679	44.85%	819	54.10%	16	1.06%	-140	-9.25%	1,514
Missoula	16,350	51.36%	15,099	47.43%	388	1.22%	1,251	3.93%	31,837
Musselshell	1,117	54.09%	922	44.65%	26	1.26%	195	9.44%	2,065
Park	3,281	57.16%	2,364	41.18%	95	1.66%	917	15.98%	5,740
Petroleum	211	63.75%	110	33.23%	10	3.02%	101	30.52%	331
Phillips	1,347	54.18%	1,117	44.93%	22	0.88%	230	9.25%	2,486
Pondera	1,666	52.89%	1,413	44.86%	71	2.25%	253	8.03%	3,150
Powder River	683	55.30%	429	34.74%	123	9.96%	254	20.56%	1,235
Powell	1,610	54.56%	1,302	44.12%	39	1.32%	308	10.44%	2,951
Prairie	597	58.59%	415	40.73%	7	0.69%	182	17.86%	1,019
Ravalli	4,894	56.29%	3,504	40.30%	296	3.40%	1,390	15.99%	8,694
Richland	2,189	51.35%	1,961	46.00%	113	2.65%	228	5.35%	4,263
Roosevelt	1,822	46.38%	2,061	52.47%	45	1.15%	-239	-6.09%	3,928
Rosebud	1,538	51.16%	1,413	47.01%	55	1.83%	125	4.15%	3,006
Sanders	1,738	48.60%	1,725	48.24%	113	3.16%	13	0.36%	3,576
Sheridan	1,114	41.05%	1,560	57.48%	40	1.47%	-446	-16.43%	2,714
Silver Bow	7,506	39.28%	11,377	59.53%	227	1.19%	-3,871	-20.25%	19,110
Stillwater	1,446	54.88%	1,143	43.38%	46	1.75%	303	11.50%	2,635
Sweet Grass	1,135	68.41%	502	30.26%	22	1.33%	633	38.15%	1,659
Teton	1,730	51.72%	1,506	45.02%	109	3.26%	224	6.70%	3,345
Toole	1,469	56.43%	1,080	41.49%	54	2.07%	389	14.94%	2,603
Treasure	315	55.85%	239	42.38%	10	1.77%	76	13.47%	564
Valley	2,520	50.82%	2,352	47.43%	87	1.75%	168	3.39%	4,959
Wheatland	755	57.20%	535	40.53%	30	2.27%	220	16.67%	1,320
Wibaux	308	44.57%	352	50.94%	31	4.49%	-44	-6.37%	691
Yellowstone	25,201	57.11%	18,329	41.54%	595	1.35%	6,872	15.57%	44,125
Totals	173,703	52.84%	149,259	45.40%	5,772	1.76%	24,444	7.44%	328,734

==== Counties that flipped from Republican to Democratic ====
- Big Horn
- Blaine
- Hill
- Lincoln
- McCone
- Mineral
- Roosevelt
- Sheridan
- Wibaux

== See also ==
- United States presidential elections in Montana
