= 1904 United States presidential election in Montana =

- November 8, 1904
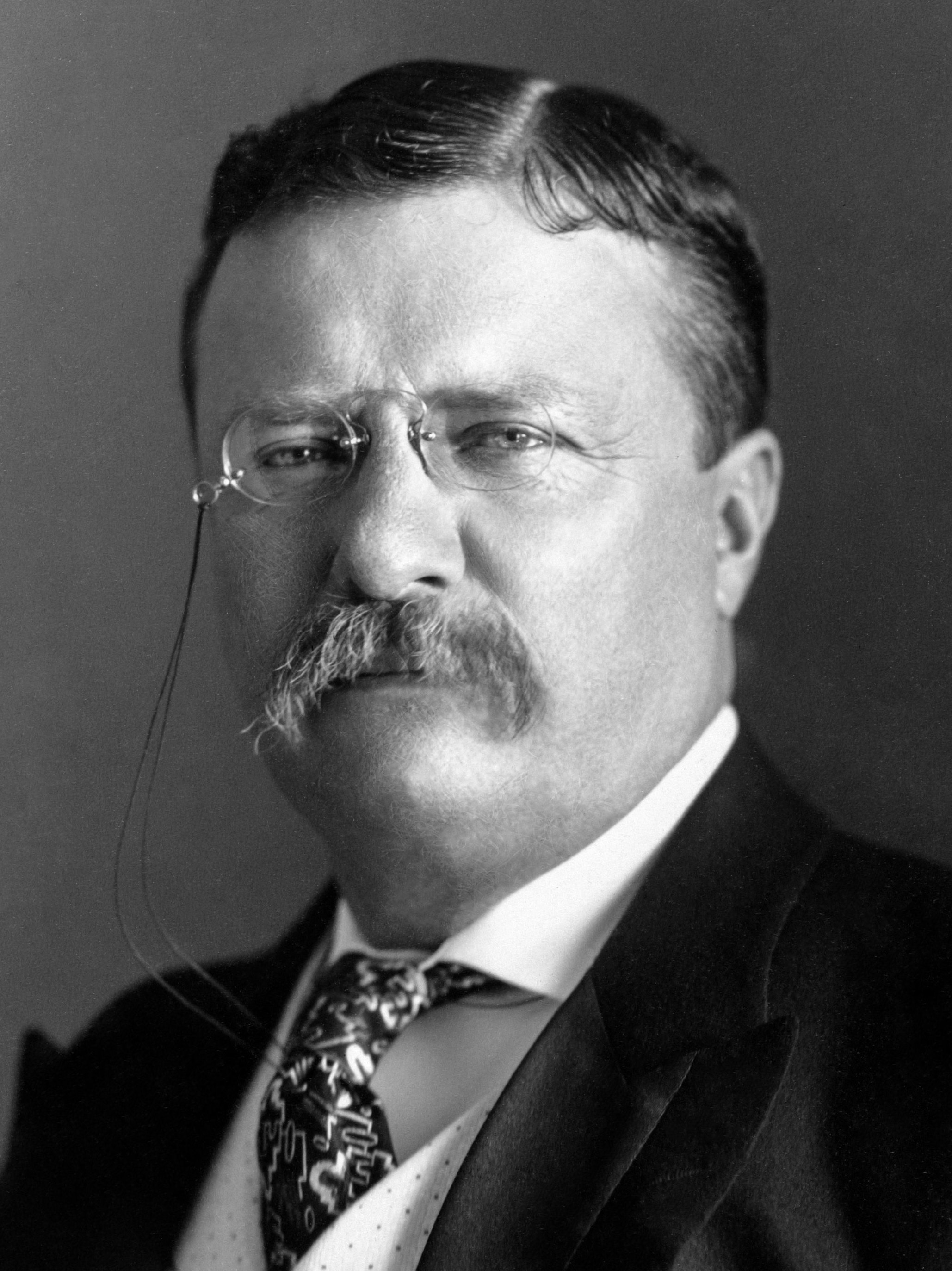

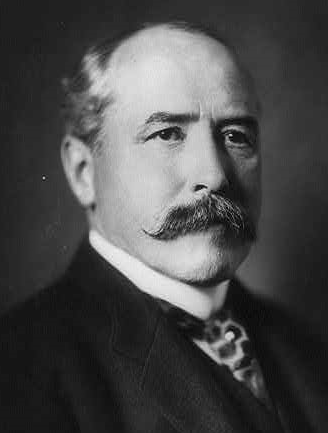

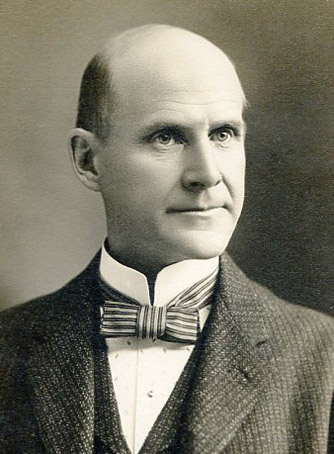
Nominee	Theodore Roosevelt	Alton B. Parker	Eugene V. Debs
Party	Republican	Democratic	Socialist
Home state	New York	New York	Indiana
Running mate	Charles W. Fairbanks	Henry G. Davis	Ben Hanford
Electoral vote	3	0	0
Popular vote	34,932	21,773	5,676
Percentage	54.21%	33.79%	8.81%
County results
Roosevelt
40–50%
50–60%
60–70%
70–80%
Parker
30–40%
40–50%
President before election
Theodore Roosevelt
Republican
Elected President
Theodore Roosevelt
Republican

The 1904 United States presidential election in Montana took place on November 8, 1904, as part of the 1904 United States presidential election. Voters chose three representatives, or electors to the Electoral College, who voted for president and vice president.

Montana overwhelmingly voted for the Republican nominee, President Theodore Roosevelt, over the Democratic nominee, former Chief Judge of New York Court of Appeals Alton B. Parker. Roosevelt won Montana by a landslide margin of 20.42%. It was the first time Montana was won by a Republican candidate since it was won by Benjamin Harrison in 1892, and the first time ever that the state backed the winning candidate.

== Results ==
1904 United States presidential election in Montana
Party	Candidate	Votes	Percentage	Electoral votes
Republican	Theodore Roosevelt (incumbent)	34,932	54.21%	3
Democratic	Alton B. Parker	21,773	33.79%	0
Socialist	Eugene V. Debs	5,676	8.81%	0
People's Party	Thomas E. Watson	1,520	2.36%	0
Prohibition	Silas C. Swallow	335	0.52%	0
Socialist Labor	Charles Hunter Corregan	208	0.32%	0
Totals		64,236	100.00%	3

=== Results by county ===
County	Theodore Roosevelt Republican		Alton B. Parker Democratic		Eugene V. Debs Socialist		Thomas E. Watson Populist		Silas C. Swallow Prohibition		Charles H. Corregan Socialist Labor		Margin		Total votes cast
County	#	%	#	%	#	%	#	%	#	%	#	%	#	%	Total votes cast
Beaverhead	1,021	59.81%	650	38.08%	24	1.41%	10	0.59%	1	0.06%	1	0.06%	371	21.73%	1,707
Broadwater	392	44.90%	403	46.16%	64	7.33%	10	1.15%	2	0.23%	2	0.23%	-11	-1.26%	873
Carbon	1,130	59.07%	464	24.26%	308	16.10%	5	0.26%	6	0.31%	0	0.00%	666	34.81%	1,913
Cascade	2,405	55.34%	1,385	31.87%	470	10.81%	69	1.59%	14	0.32%	3	0.07%	1,020	23.47%	4,346
Chouteau	1,517	70.62%	568	26.44%	52	2.42%	3	0.14%	7	0.33%	1	0.05%	949	44.18%	2,148
Custer	824	72.22%	285	24.98%	21	1.84%	8	0.70%	2	0.18%	1	0.09%	539	47.24%	1,141
Dawson	769	77.44%	189	19.03%	28	2.82%	2	0.20%	5	0.50%	0	0.00%	580	58.41%	993
Deer Lodge	1,666	48.64%	1,504	43.91%	228	6.66%	12	0.35%	5	0.15%	10	0.29%	162	4.73%	3,425
Fergus	1,599	63.23%	780	30.84%	131	5.18%	9	0.36%	9	0.36%	1	0.04%	819	32.38%	2,529
Flathead	1,969	64.54%	861	28.22%	184	6.03%	17	0.56%	13	0.43%	7	0.23%	1,108	36.32%	3,051
Gallatin	1,700	55.77%	1,130	37.07%	151	4.95%	9	0.30%	55	1.80%	3	0.10%	570	18.70%	3,048
Granite	576	49.40%	521	44.68%	40	3.43%	24	2.06%	1	0.09%	4	0.34%	55	4.72%	1,166
Jefferson	663	45.54%	580	39.84%	192	13.19%	5	0.34%	15	1.03%	1	0.07%	83	5.70%	1,456
Lewis and Clark	2,505	54.60%	1,543	33.63%	472	10.29%	27	0.59%	20	0.44%	21	0.46%	962	20.97%	4,588
Madison	1,314	55.16%	971	40.76%	61	2.56%	24	1.01%	9	0.38%	3	0.13%	343	14.40%	2,382
Meagher	485	66.90%	230	31.72%	9	1.24%	0	0.00%	1	0.14%	0	0.00%	255	35.17%	725
Missoula	2,239	59.90%	996	26.65%	463	12.39%	9	0.24%	20	0.54%	11	0.29%	1,243	33.25%	3,738
Park	1,408	59.51%	583	24.64%	365	15.43%	1	0.04%	9	0.38%	0	0.00%	825	34.87%	2,366
Powell	721	60.54%	422	35.43%	31	2.60%	8	0.67%	9	0.76%	0	0.00%	299	25.10%	1,191
Ravalli	1,083	57.45%	523	27.75%	250	13.26%	4	0.21%	22	1.17%	3	0.16%	560	29.71%	1,885
Rosebud	460	75.66%	134	22.04%	12	1.97%	0	0.00%	1	0.16%	1	0.16%	326	53.62%	608
Silver Bow	5,149	36.07%	5,686	39.83%	1,978	13.86%	1,235	8.65%	100	0.70%	126	0.88%	-537	-3.76%	14,274
Sweet Grass	538	70.51%	174	22.80%	48	6.29%	1	0.13%	2	0.26%	0	0.00%	364	47.71%	763
Teton	808	64.23%	420	33.39%	17	1.35%	8	0.64%	0	0.00%	5	0.40%	388	30.84%	1,258
Valley	742	67.70%	335	30.57%	11	1.00%	6	0.55%	1	0.09%	1	0.09%	407	37.14%	1,096
Yellowstone	1,249	70.41%	436	24.58%	66	3.72%	14	0.79%	6	0.34%	3	0.17%	813	45.83%	1,774
Totals	34,932	54.21%	21,773	33.79%	5,676	8.81%	1,520	2.36%	335	0.52%	208	0.32%	13,159	20.42%	64,444

== See also ==
- United States presidential elections in Montana
