= Georgetown, Montana =

Unincorporated community in Montana, United States

- Unincorporated community
- Location within Montana Location within the United States
- Coordinates: 46°11′58″N 113°14′47″W
- Country: United States
- State: Montana
- County: Deer Lodge
- Elevation: 6,519 ft (1,987 m)
- Time zone: UTC-7 (Mountain (MST))
  - Summer (DST): UTC-6 (MDT)
- Area code: 406
- GNIS feature ID: 783902

Georgetown is an unincorporated community in Deer Lodge County, Montana, United States. It is located on Pintler Veterans Memorial Scenic Highway, 18 miles from Anaconda.

Nearby are Georgetown Lake and Silver Lake.
