= 1940 United States presidential election in Montana =

- November 5, 1940

Nominee	Franklin D. Roosevelt	Wendell Willkie
Party	Democratic	Republican
Home state	New York	New York
Running mate	Henry A. Wallace	Charles L. McNary
Electoral vote	4	0
Popular vote	145,698	99,579
Percentage	58.78%	40.17%
County results
Roosevelt
50–60%
60–70%
Willkie
50–60%
President before election
Franklin D. Roosevelt
Democratic
Elected President
Franklin D. Roosevelt
Democratic

The 1940 United States presidential election in Montana took place on November 5, 1940, as part of the 1940 United States presidential election. Voters chose four representatives, or electors to the Electoral College, who voted for president and vice president.

Montana voted powerfully to give Democratic nominee, President Franklin D. Roosevelt an unprecedented third term, over the Republican nominee, corporate lawyer Wendell Willkie, a dark horse candidate that had never before run for a political office. Roosevelt won Montana by a convincing 18.61% margin. As of the 2024 presidential election, this remains the last election in which the following counties have voted for a Democratic presidential nominee: Broadwater, Madison, Meagher and Garfield.

== Results ==
1940 United States presidential election in Montana
Party	Candidate	Votes	Percentage	Electoral votes
Democratic	Franklin D. Roosevelt (incumbent)	145,698	58.78%	4
Republican	Wendell Willkie	99,579	40.17%	0
Socialist	Norman Thomas	1,443	0.58%	0
Prohibition	Roger Babson	664	0.27%	0
Communist	Earl Browder	489	0.20%	0
Totals		247,783	100.00%	4

=== Results by county ===
County	Franklin Delano Roosevelt Democratic		Wendell Lewis Willkie Republican		Various candidates Other parties		Margin		Total votes cast
County	#	%	#	%	#	%	#	%	Total votes cast
Beaverhead	1,632	48.41%	1,725	51.17%	14	0.42%	-93	-2.76%	3,371
Big Horn	1,926	54.10%	1,616	45.39%	18	0.51%	310	8.71%	3,560
Blaine	2,129	63.99%	1,165	35.02%	33	0.99%	964	28.98%	3,327
Broadwater	854	52.94%	755	46.81%	4	0.25%	99	6.14%	1,613
Carbon	2,678	51.89%	2,421	46.91%	62	1.20%	257	4.98%	5,161
Carter	734	56.81%	556	43.03%	2	0.15%	178	13.78%	1,292
Cascade	13,637	67.10%	6,443	31.70%	244	1.20%	7,194	35.40%	20,324
Chouteau	2,213	63.68%	1,235	35.54%	27	0.78%	978	28.14%	3,475
Custer	2,782	57.55%	2,017	41.73%	35	0.72%	765	15.83%	4,834
Daniels	1,086	56.53%	807	42.01%	28	1.46%	279	14.52%	1,921
Dawson	1,765	52.03%	1,612	47.52%	15	0.44%	153	4.51%	3,392
Deer Lodge	4,916	66.93%	2,397	32.63%	32	0.44%	2,519	34.30%	7,345
Fallon	686	42.24%	925	56.96%	13	0.80%	-239	-14.72%	1,624
Fergus	3,873	58.51%	2,706	40.88%	40	0.60%	1,167	17.63%	6,619
Flathead	5,127	52.96%	4,403	45.48%	151	1.56%	724	7.48%	9,681
Gallatin	4,718	57.55%	3,430	41.84%	50	0.61%	1,288	15.71%	8,198
Garfield	644	50.67%	625	49.17%	2	0.16%	19	1.49%	1,271
Glacier	2,399	63.80%	1,352	35.96%	9	0.24%	1,047	27.85%	3,760
Golden Valley	351	46.25%	402	52.96%	6	0.79%	-51	-6.72%	759
Granite	917	53.63%	784	45.85%	9	0.53%	133	7.78%	1,710
Hill	3,700	65.87%	1,842	32.79%	75	1.34%	1,858	33.08%	5,617
Jefferson	1,259	60.04%	830	39.58%	8	0.38%	429	20.46%	2,097
Judith Basin	1,215	63.51%	670	35.02%	28	1.46%	545	28.49%	1,913
Lake	2,379	45.92%	2,718	52.46%	84	1.62%	-339	-6.54%	5,181
Lewis and Clark	5,814	54.42%	4,762	44.58%	107	1.00%	1,052	9.85%	10,683
Liberty	550	55.33%	434	43.66%	10	1.01%	116	11.67%	994
Lincoln	2,150	62.35%	1,250	36.25%	48	1.39%	900	26.10%	3,448
Madison	1,674	51.41%	1,557	47.82%	25	0.77%	117	3.59%	3,256
McCone	928	61.83%	529	35.24%	44	2.93%	399	26.58%	1,501
Meagher	621	53.67%	520	44.94%	16	1.38%	101	8.73%	1,157
Mineral	645	60.39%	402	37.64%	21	1.97%	243	22.75%	1,068
Missoula	7,747	57.23%	5,640	41.66%	150	1.11%	2,107	15.56%	13,537
Musselshell	1,807	61.21%	1,086	36.79%	59	2.00%	721	24.42%	2,952
Park	2,833	53.26%	2,433	45.74%	53	1.00%	400	7.52%	5,319
Petroleum	316	50.08%	313	49.60%	2	0.32%	3	0.48%	631
Phillips	2,225	66.10%	1,110	32.98%	31	0.92%	1,115	33.13%	3,366
Pondera	1,899	63.72%	1,038	34.83%	43	1.44%	861	28.89%	2,980
Powder River	561	46.29%	633	52.23%	18	1.49%	-72	-5.94%	1,212
Powell	1,765	60.82%	1,116	38.46%	21	0.72%	649	22.36%	2,902
Prairie	554	47.72%	597	51.42%	10	0.86%	-43	-3.70%	1,161
Ravalli	2,773	52.19%	2,483	46.73%	57	1.07%	290	5.46%	5,313
Richland	2,095	57.48%	1,497	41.07%	53	1.45%	598	16.41%	3,645
Roosevelt	2,418	60.72%	1,503	37.74%	61	1.53%	915	22.98%	3,982
Rosebud	1,399	52.26%	1,252	46.77%	26	0.97%	147	5.49%	2,677
Sanders	1,634	58.48%	1,088	38.94%	72	2.58%	546	19.54%	2,794
Sheridan	2,108	69.07%	892	29.23%	52	1.70%	1,216	39.84%	3,052
Silver Bow	17,467	67.88%	7,932	30.82%	335	1.30%	9,535	37.05%	25,734
Stillwater	1,201	48.53%	1,255	50.71%	19	0.77%	-54	-2.18%	2,475
Sweet Grass	741	46.00%	861	53.45%	9	0.56%	-120	-7.45%	1,611
Teton	1,735	59.95%	1,132	39.12%	27	0.93%	603	20.84%	2,894
Toole	1,954	61.41%	1,218	38.28%	10	0.31%	736	23.13%	3,182
Treasure	321	52.62%	287	47.05%	2	0.33%	34	5.57%	610
Valley	3,493	67.67%	1,597	30.94%	72	1.39%	1,896	36.73%	5,162
Wheatland	948	54.42%	786	45.12%	8	0.46%	162	9.30%	1,742
Wibaux	576	55.23%	461	44.20%	6	0.58%	115	11.03%	1,043
Yellowstone	9,036	51.18%	8,479	48.03%	140	0.79%	557	3.15%	17,655
Totals	145,608	58.76%	99,579	40.19%	2,596	1.05%	46,029	18.58%	247,783

==== Counties that flipped from Democratic to Republican ====
- Beaverhead
- Fallon
- Golden Valley
- Lake
- Powder River
- Prairie
- Stillwater
- Sweet Grass

== See also ==
- United States presidential elections in Montana
