= 1948 United States presidential election in Montana =

- November 2, 1948

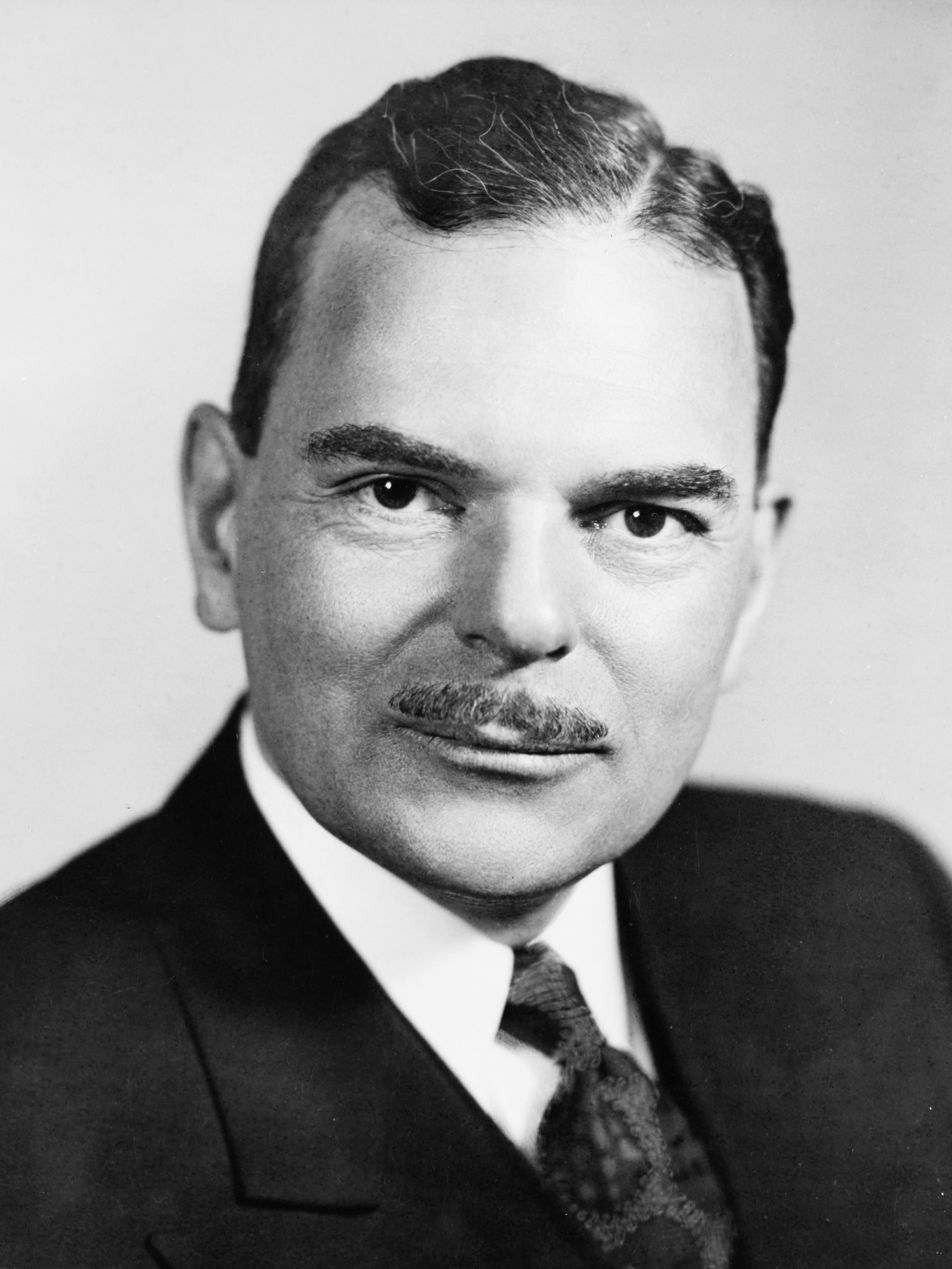
Nominee	Harry S. Truman	Thomas E. Dewey
Party	Democratic	Republican
Home state	Missouri	New York
Running mate	Alben W. Barkley	Earl Warren
Electoral vote	4	0
Popular vote	119,071	96,770
Percentage	53.09%	43.15%
County results
Truman
40–50%
50–60%
60–70%
Dewey
40–50%
50–60%
60–70%
President before election
Harry S. Truman
Democratic
Elected President
Harry S. Truman
Democratic

The 1948 United States presidential election in Montana took place on November 2, 1948, as part of the 1948 United States presidential election. Voters chose four representatives, or electors to the Electoral College, who voted for president and vice president.

Montana voted for the Democratic nominee, President Harry S. Truman, over the Republican nominee, New York Governor Thomas E. Dewey. Truman won Montana by a substantial margin of 9.94%. As of the 2024 presidential election, this is the last election in which Carter County and Prairie County voted for a Democratic presidential candidate. This (and the prior election) also mark the last time that Montana has voted Democratic in two consecutive presidential elections.

== Results ==
1948 United States presidential election in Montana
Party	Candidate	Votes	Percentage	Electoral votes
Democratic	Harry Truman (incumbent)	119,071	53.09%	4
Republican	Thomas E. Dewey	96,770	43.15%	0
Progressive	Henry A. Wallace	7,313	3.26%	0
Socialist	Norman Thomas	695	0.31%	0
Prohibition	Claude Watson	429	0.19%	0
Totals		224,278	100.00%	4

=== Results by county ===
County	Harry S. Truman Democratic		Thomas E. Dewey Republican		Henry A. Wallace Progressive		Various candidates Other parties		Margin		Total votes cast
County	#	%	#	%	#	%	#	%	#	%	Total votes cast
Beaverhead	1,356	45.12%	1,583	52.68%	63	2.10%	3	0.10%	-227	-7.55%	3,005
Big Horn	1,328	49.15%	1,334	49.37%	32	1.18%	8	0.30%	-6	-0.22%	2,702
Blaine	1,669	60.74%	997	36.28%	59	2.15%	23	0.84%	672	24.45%	2,748
Broadwater	536	42.34%	704	55.61%	22	1.74%	4	0.32%	-168	-13.27%	1,266
Carbon	1,997	47.90%	1,901	45.60%	248	5.95%	23	0.55%	96	2.30%	4,169
Carter	568	52.40%	501	46.22%	12	1.11%	3	0.28%	67	6.18%	1,084
Cascade	12,082	60.97%	6,830	34.47%	806	4.07%	99	0.50%	5,252	26.50%	19,817
Chouteau	1,832	58.38%	1,181	37.64%	116	3.70%	9	0.29%	651	20.75%	3,138
Custer	2,359	55.34%	1,845	43.28%	46	1.08%	13	0.30%	514	12.06%	4,263
Daniels	826	54.24%	624	40.97%	70	4.60%	3	0.20%	202	13.26%	1,523
Dawson	1,397	46.30%	1,555	51.54%	46	1.52%	19	0.63%	-158	-5.24%	3,017
Deer Lodge	3,862	62.17%	2,036	32.78%	293	4.72%	21	0.34%	1,826	29.39%	6,212
Fallon	623	46.88%	678	51.02%	22	1.66%	6	0.45%	-55	-4.14%	1,329
Fergus	3,059	54.12%	2,411	42.66%	162	2.87%	20	0.35%	648	11.46%	5,652
Flathead	4,546	49.45%	4,240	46.12%	326	3.55%	81	0.88%	306	3.33%	9,193
Gallatin	3,548	44.63%	4,220	53.08%	135	1.70%	47	0.59%	-672	-8.45%	7,950
Garfield	451	46.35%	501	51.49%	19	1.95%	2	0.21%	-50	-5.14%	973
Glacier	2,238	63.80%	1,238	35.29%	22	0.63%	10	0.29%	1,000	28.51%	3,508
Golden Valley	295	44.49%	352	53.09%	15	2.26%	1	0.15%	-57	-8.60%	663
Granite	567	44.72%	659	51.97%	33	2.60%	9	0.71%	-92	-7.26%	1,268
Hill	3,321	64.10%	1,645	31.75%	168	3.24%	47	0.91%	1,676	32.35%	5,181
Jefferson	836	50.85%	750	45.62%	55	3.35%	3	0.18%	86	5.23%	1,644
Judith Basin	934	56.20%	609	36.64%	113	6.80%	6	0.36%	325	19.55%	1,662
Lake	2,177	46.82%	2,295	49.35%	152	3.27%	26	0.56%	-118	-2.54%	4,650
Lewis and Clark	4,745	46.63%	5,174	50.85%	230	2.26%	27	0.27%	-429	-4.22%	10,176
Liberty	542	58.53%	354	38.23%	27	2.92%	3	0.32%	188	20.30%	926
Lincoln	1,689	58.38%	1,079	37.30%	105	3.63%	20	0.69%	610	21.09%	2,893
Madison	1,006	42.68%	1,300	55.15%	45	1.91%	6	0.25%	-294	-12.47%	2,357
McCone	702	51.20%	518	37.78%	146	10.65%	5	0.36%	184	13.42%	1,371
Meagher	497	48.02%	518	50.05%	16	1.55%	4	0.39%	-21	-2.03%	1,035
Mineral	475	55.23%	338	39.30%	41	4.77%	6	0.70%	137	15.93%	860
Missoula	7,005	50.49%	6,426	46.32%	324	2.34%	118	0.85%	579	4.17%	13,873
Musselshell	1,188	47.60%	1,010	40.46%	285	11.42%	13	0.52%	178	7.13%	2,496
Park	2,222	45.86%	2,461	50.79%	131	2.70%	31	0.64%	-239	-4.93%	4,845
Petroleum	235	50.98%	214	46.42%	12	2.60%	0	0.00%	21	4.56%	461
Phillips	1,506	58.62%	964	37.52%	92	3.58%	7	0.27%	542	21.10%	2,569
Pondera	1,555	60.98%	902	35.37%	85	3.33%	8	0.31%	653	25.61%	2,550
Powder River	480	36.84%	784	60.17%	30	2.30%	9	0.69%	-304	-23.33%	1,303
Powell	1,427	53.37%	1,163	43.49%	65	2.43%	19	0.71%	264	9.87%	2,674
Prairie	527	50.58%	499	47.89%	16	1.54%	0	0.00%	28	2.69%	1,042
Ravalli	2,159	45.71%	2,354	49.84%	151	3.20%	59	1.25%	-195	-4.13%	4,723
Richland	1,673	54.14%	1,332	43.11%	62	2.01%	23	0.74%	341	11.04%	3,090
Roosevelt	1,820	58.18%	1,142	36.51%	144	4.60%	22	0.70%	678	21.68%	3,128
Rosebud	1,031	47.27%	1,106	50.71%	29	1.33%	15	0.69%	-75	-3.44%	2,181
Sanders	1,425	51.50%	1,191	43.04%	134	4.84%	17	0.61%	234	8.46%	2,767
Sheridan	1,515	61.76%	699	28.50%	220	8.97%	19	0.77%	816	33.27%	2,453
Silver Bow	12,715	59.60%	7,305	34.24%	1,236	5.79%	79	0.37%	5,410	25.36%	21,335
Stillwater	890	42.64%	1,137	54.48%	53	2.54%	7	0.34%	-247	-11.84%	2,087
Sweet Grass	499	36.53%	843	61.71%	15	1.10%	9	0.66%	-344	-25.18%	1,366
Teton	1,632	60.00%	1,005	36.95%	78	2.87%	5	0.18%	627	23.05%	2,720
Toole	1,756	60.80%	1,092	37.81%	33	1.14%	7	0.24%	664	22.99%	2,888
Treasure	291	51.96%	253	45.18%	15	2.68%	1	0.18%	38	6.79%	560
Valley	2,535	61.68%	1,375	33.45%	183	4.45%	17	0.41%	1,160	28.22%	4,110
Wheatland	733	47.81%	780	50.88%	14	0.91%	6	0.39%	-47	-3.07%	1,533
Wibaux	471	52.04%	421	46.52%	4	0.44%	9	0.99%	50	5.52%	905
Yellowstone	9,718	47.67%	10,342	50.74%	251	1.23%	73	0.36%	-624	-3.06%	20,384
Totals	119,071	53.09%	96,770	43.15%	7,307	3.26%	1,130	0.50%	22,301	9.94%	224,278

==== Counties that flipped from Democratic to Republican ====
- Gallatin
- Lewis and Clark

==== Counties that flipped from Republican to Democratic ====
- Carbon
- Flathead
- Petroleum
- Prairie
- Treasure
- Wibaux

== See also ==
- United States presidential elections in Montana
