= 1936 United States presidential election in Montana =

- November 3, 1936

Nominee	Franklin D. Roosevelt	Alf Landon
Party	Democratic	Republican
Home state	New York	Kansas
Running mate	John Nance Garner	Frank Knox
Electoral vote	4	0
Popular vote	159,690	63,598
Percentage	69.28%	27.59%
County results
Roosevelt
50–60%
60–70%
70–80%
80–90%
President before election
Franklin D. Roosevelt
Democratic
Elected President
Franklin D. Roosevelt
Democratic

The 1936 United States presidential election in Montana took place on November 3, 1936, as part of the 1936 United States presidential election. Voters chose four representatives, or electors to the Electoral College, who voted for president and vice president.

Montana voted overwhelmingly for the Democratic nominee, President Franklin D. Roosevelt, over the Republican nominee, Kansas Governor Alf Landon. Roosevelt won Montana by a landslide margin of 41.69% and remains the only presidential candidate ever to sweep every county in the state. As of the 2024 presidential election, this was the last election in which Beaverhead County, Sweet Grass County, Stillwater County, Powder River County, and Fallon County voted for a Democratic presidential candidate.

== Results ==
1936 United States presidential election in Montana
Party	Candidate	Votes	Percentage	Electoral votes
Democratic	Franklin D. Roosevelt (incumbent)	159,690	69.28%	4
Republican	Alf Landon	53,598	27.59%	0
Union	William Lemke	5,549	2.41%	0
Socialist	Norman Thomas	1,066	0.46%	0
Communist	Earl Browder	385	0.17%	0
Prohibition	D. Leigh Colvin	224	0.10%	0
Totals		220,512	100.00%	4

=== Results by county ===
County	Franklin D. Roosevelt Democratic		Alf Landon Republican		William Lemke Union		Various candidates Other parties		Margin		Total votes cast (Note: There are some internal differences between these sources used to compile this table, so the figures given may not be perfectly exact.)
County	#	%	#	%	#	%	#	%	#	%	Total votes cast
Beaverhead	2,153	60.85%	1,304	36.86%	75	2.12%	6	0.17%	849	24.00%	3,538
Big Horn	2,037	63.94%	1,087	34.12%	55	1.73%	7	0.22%	950	29.82%	3,186
Blaine	2,166	70.46%	851	27.68%	47	1.53%	10	0.33%	1,315	42.78%	3,074
Broadwater	1,071	67.06%	502	31.43%	19	1.19%	5	0.31%	569	35.63%	1,597
Carbon	3,116	63.90%	1,617	33.16%	97	1.99%	46	0.94%	1,499	30.74%	4,876
Carter	929	65.70%	464	32.81%	18	1.27%	3	0.21%	465	32.89%	1,414
Cascade	13,325	74.91%	4,077	22.92%	256	1.44%	131	0.74%	9,248	51.99%	17,789
Chouteau	2,734	74.76%	878	24.01%	21	0.57%	24	0.66%	1,856	50.75%	3,657
Custer	3,196	67.81%	1,381	29.30%	108	2.29%	28	0.59%	1,815	38.51%	4,713
Daniels	1,596	75.46%	467	22.08%	27	1.28%	25	1.18%	1,129	53.38%	2,115
Dawson	2,169	63.61%	1,221	35.81%	9	0.26%	11	0.32%	948	27.80%	3,410
Deer Lodge	4,813	73.49%	1,640	25.04%	76	1.16%	20	0.31%	3,173	48.45%	6,549
Fallon	1,015	61.11%	598	36.00%	39	2.35%	9	0.54%	417	25.11%	1,661
Fergus	4,675	69.31%	1,821	27.00%	212	3.14%	37	0.55%	2,854	42.31%	6,745
Flathead	5,408	63.38%	2,460	28.83%	539	6.32%	125	1.47%	2,948	34.55%	8,532
Gallatin	4,697	65.53%	2,151	30.01%	286	3.99%	34	0.47%	2,546	35.52%	7,168
Garfield	991	62.84%	548	34.75%	31	1.97%	7	0.44%	443	28.09%	1,577
Glacier	2,453	75.13%	781	23.92%	21	0.64%	10	0.31%	1,672	51.21%	3,265
Golden Valley	474	57.73%	331	40.32%	12	1.46%	4	0.49%	143	17.42%	821
Granite	1,227	71.17%	475	27.55%	13	0.75%	9	0.52%	752	43.62%	1,724
Hill	4,328	78.41%	1,014	18.37%	144	2.61%	34	0.62%	3,314	60.04%	5,520
Jefferson	1,409	68.30%	573	27.78%	61	2.96%	20	0.97%	836	40.52%	2,063
Judith Basin	1,534	68.76%	645	28.91%	31	1.39%	21	0.94%	889	39.85%	2,231
Lake	2,656	60.06%	1,401	31.68%	341	7.71%	24	0.54%	1,255	28.38%	4,422
Lewis and Clark	5,614	64.34%	2,951	33.82%	108	1.24%	52	0.60%	2,663	30.52%	8,725
Liberty	758	71.17%	276	25.92%	25	2.35%	6	0.56%	482	45.26%	1,065
Lincoln	2,117	69.41%	745	24.43%	150	4.92%	38	1.25%	1,372	44.98%	3,050
Madison	1,819	62.94%	1,006	34.81%	52	1.80%	13	0.45%	813	28.13%	2,890
McCone	1,366	78.55%	332	19.09%	7	0.40%	34	1.96%	1,034	59.46%	1,739
Meagher	767	59.92%	495	38.67%	9	0.70%	9	0.70%	272	21.25%	1,280
Mineral	657	68.44%	215	22.40%	73	7.60%	15	1.56%	442	46.04%	960
Missoula	7,690	71.18%	2,697	24.97%	325	3.01%	91	0.84%	4,993	46.22%	10,803
Musselshell	2,092	69.41%	771	25.58%	105	3.48%	46	1.53%	1,321	43.83%	3,014
Park	2,968	70.40%	1,006	23.86%	212	5.03%	30	0.71%	1,962	46.54%	4,216
Petroleum	523	64.89%	258	32.01%	25	3.10%	0	0.00%	265	32.88%	806
Phillips	2,555	73.13%	850	24.33%	70	2.00%	19	0.54%	1,705	48.80%	3,494
Pondera	2,213	75.43%	658	22.43%	45	1.53%	18	0.61%	1,555	53.00%	2,934
Powder River	758	56.19%	545	40.40%	33	2.45%	13	0.96%	213	15.79%	1,349
Powell	2,060	70.69%	799	27.42%	33	1.13%	22	0.75%	1,261	43.27%	2,914
Prairie	877	64.34%	454	33.31%	23	1.69%	9	0.66%	423	31.03%	1,363
Ravalli	2,859	60.42%	1,580	33.39%	253	5.35%	40	0.85%	1,279	27.03%	4,732
Richland	2,516	68.43%	1,066	28.99%	83	2.26%	12	0.33%	1,450	39.43%	3,677
Roosevelt	2,923	71.14%	1,052	25.60%	115	2.80%	19	0.46%	1,871	45.53%	4,109
Rosebud	1,624	60.82%	866	32.43%	142	5.32%	38	1.42%	758	28.39%	2,670
Sanders	1,788	65.37%	718	26.25%	181	6.62%	48	1.76%	1,070	39.12%	2,735
Sheridan	2,503	79.01%	513	16.19%	91	2.87%	61	1.93%	1,990	62.82%	3,168
Silver Bow	17,697	78.23%	4,528	20.02%	201	0.89%	197	0.87%	13,169	58.21%	22,623
Stillwater	1,292	53.34%	1,034	42.69%	78	3.22%	18	0.74%	258	10.65%	2,422
Sweet Grass	783	50.71%	664	43.01%	85	5.51%	12	0.78%	119	7.71%	1,544
Teton	1,917	75.18%	604	23.69%	23	0.90%	6	0.24%	1,313	51.49%	2,550
Toole	2,120	73.51%	654	22.68%	101	3.50%	9	0.31%	1,466	50.83%	2,884
Treasure	398	59.49%	244	36.47%	25	3.74%	2	0.30%	154	23.02%	669
Valley	5,862	83.07%	996	14.11%	144	2.04%	55	0.78%	4,866	68.95%	7,057
Wheatland	1,037	62.51%	602	36.29%	18	1.08%	2	0.12%	435	26.22%	1,659
Wibaux	790	68.04%	362	31.18%	6	0.52%	3	0.26%	428	36.86%	1,161
Yellowstone	8,575	61.18%	5,193	37.05%	160	1.14%	88	0.63%	3,382	24.13%	14,016
Totals	159,690	69.45%	63,021	27.41%	5,539	2.41%	1,675	0.73%	96,669	42.04%	229,925

==== Counties that flipped from Republican to Democratic ====
- Sweet Grass

== See also ==
- United States presidential elections in Montana
