= 1932 United States presidential election in Montana =

- November 8, 1932

Nominee	Franklin D. Roosevelt	Herbert Hoover
Party	Democratic	Republican
Home state	New York	Iowa
Running mate	John Nance Garner	Charles Curtis
Electoral vote	4	0
Popular vote	127,286	78,078
Percentage	58.80%	36.07%
County results
Roosevelt
40–50%
50–60%
60–70%
70–80%
Hoover
40–50%
President before election
Herbert Hoover
Republican
Elected President
Franklin D. Roosevelt
Democratic

The 1932 United States presidential election in Montana took place on November 8, 1932, as part of the 1932 United States presidential election. Voters chose four representatives, or electors to the Electoral College, who voted for president and vice president.

Montana overwhelmingly voted for the Democratic nominee, New York Governor Franklin D. Roosevelt, over the Republican nominee, President Herbert Hoover. Roosevelt won Montana by a landslide margin of 22.73%.

== Results ==
1932 United States presidential election in Montana
Party	Candidate	Votes	Percentage	Electoral votes
Democratic	Franklin D. Roosevelt	127,286	58.80%	4
Republican	Herbert Hoover (incumbent)	78,078	36.07%	0
Socialist	Norman Thomas	7,891	3.65%	0
Communist	William Foster	1,775	0.82%	0
Liberty/Independent	William Hope Harvey	1,449	0.67%	0
Totals		216,479	100.00%	4

=== Results by county ===
County	Franklin D. Roosevelt Democratic		Herbert Hoover Republican		Norman Thomas Socialist		William Foster Communist		William Hope Harvey Liberty		Margin		Total votes cast (Note: There are some internal differences between these sources used to compile this table, so the figures given may not be perfectly exact.)
County	#	%	#	%	#	%	#	%	#	%	#	%	Total votes cast
Beaverhead	1,834	55.73%	1,418	43.09%	32	0.97%	1	0.03%	6	0.18%	416	12.64%	3,291
Big Horn	1,637	62.29%	957	36.42%	27	1.03%	1	0.04%	6	0.23%	680	25.88%	2,628
Blaine	1,977	62.56%	1,063	33.64%	108	3.42%	6	0.19%	6	0.19%	914	28.92%	3,160
Broadwater	988	65.04%	512	33.71%	11	0.72%	6	0.39%	2	0.13%	476	31.34%	1,519
Carbon	2,872	56.58%	1,942	38.26%	146	2.88%	110	2.17%	6	0.12%	930	18.32%	5,076
Carter	915	60.56%	565	37.39%	29	1.92%	0	0.00%	2	0.13%	350	23.16%	1,511
Cascade	10,047	59.72%	5,800	34.48%	589	3.50%	300	1.78%	87	0.52%	4,247	25.25%	16,823
Chouteau	2,093	60.20%	1,232	35.43%	130	3.74%	7	0.20%	15	0.43%	861	24.76%	3,477
Custer	2,729	60.27%	1,675	36.99%	100	2.21%	5	0.11%	19	0.42%	1,054	23.28%	4,528
Daniels	1,172	62.14%	482	25.56%	56	2.97%	44	2.33%	132	7.00%	690	36.59%	1,886
Dawson	1,929	55.80%	1,470	42.52%	44	1.27%	0	0.00%	14	0.40%	459	13.28%	3,457
Deer Lodge	3,893	62.75%	2,198	35.43%	103	1.66%	7	0.11%	3	0.05%	1,695	27.32%	6,204
Fallon	973	56.11%	690	39.79%	69	3.98%	0	0.00%	2	0.12%	283	16.32%	1,734
Fergus	4,470	62.64%	2,400	33.63%	238	3.34%	11	0.15%	17	0.24%	2,070	29.01%	7,136
Flathead	4,026	52.40%	2,978	38.76%	655	8.53%	9	0.12%	15	0.20%	1,048	13.64%	7,683
Gallatin	4,359	61.44%	2,553	35.98%	146	2.06%	6	0.08%	31	0.44%	1,806	25.45%	7,095
Garfield	1,044	58.49%	678	37.98%	36	2.02%	0	0.00%	27	1.51%	366	20.50%	1,785
Glacier	1,717	70.40%	702	28.78%	18	0.74%	1	0.04%	1	0.04%	1,015	41.62%	2,439
Golden Valley	469	51.43%	423	46.38%	16	1.75%	1	0.11%	3	0.33%	46	5.04%	912
Granite	855	59.42%	536	37.25%	45	3.13%	2	0.14%	1	0.07%	319	22.17%	1,439
Hill	3,257	64.44%	1,589	31.44%	194	3.84%	2	0.04%	12	0.24%	1,668	33.00%	5,054
Jefferson	1,246	58.94%	784	37.09%	73	3.45%	7	0.33%	4	0.19%	462	21.85%	2,114
Judith Basin	1,280	60.07%	720	33.79%	54	2.53%	65	3.05%	12	0.56%	560	26.28%	2,131
Lake	2,514	61.59%	1,361	33.34%	189	4.63%	4	0.10%	14	0.34%	1,153	28.25%	4,082
Lewis and Clark	4,714	54.84%	3,671	42.71%	186	2.16%	17	0.20%	8	0.09%	1,043	12.13%	8,596
Liberty	731	72.38%	252	24.95%	20	1.98%	1	0.10%	6	0.59%	479	47.43%	1,010
Lincoln	1,867	64.25%	833	28.66%	195	6.71%	2	0.07%	9	0.31%	1,034	35.58%	2,906
Madison	1,764	59.27%	1,097	36.86%	102	3.43%	6	0.20%	7	0.24%	667	22.41%	2,976
McCone	1,020	58.93%	456	26.34%	232	13.40%	8	0.46%	15	0.87%	564	32.58%	1,731
Meagher	621	56.35%	462	41.92%	19	1.72%	0	0.00%	0	0.00%	159	14.43%	1,102
Mineral	578	60.52%	260	27.23%	117	12.25%	0	0.00%	0	0.00%	318	33.30%	955
Missoula	5,242	54.51%	3,819	39.72%	536	5.57%	10	0.10%	9	0.09%	1,423	14.80%	9,616
Musselshell	1,584	55.77%	1,021	35.95%	169	5.95%	65	2.29%	1	0.04%	563	19.82%	2,840
Park	2,533	54.96%	1,895	41.12%	163	3.54%	3	0.07%	15	0.33%	638	13.84%	4,609
Petroleum	544	58.87%	351	37.99%	28	3.03%	1	0.11%	0	0.00%	193	20.89%	924
Phillips	2,054	61.79%	1,127	33.90%	125	3.76%	7	0.21%	11	0.33%	927	27.89%	3,324
Pondera	1,805	62.78%	930	32.35%	111	3.86%	7	0.24%	22	0.77%	875	30.43%	2,875
Powder River	875	60.34%	515	35.52%	40	2.76%	3	0.21%	17	1.17%	360	24.83%	1,450
Powell	1,869	62.40%	1,031	34.42%	82	2.74%	9	0.30%	4	0.13%	838	27.98%	2,995
Prairie	732	52.78%	634	45.71%	18	1.30%	0	0.00%	3	0.22%	98	7.07%	1,387
Ravalli	2,292	53.17%	1,714	39.76%	229	5.31%	5	0.12%	71	1.65%	578	13.41%	4,311
Richland	1,768	56.74%	1,216	39.02%	126	4.04%	2	0.06%	4	0.13%	552	17.72%	3,116
Roosevelt	2,263	64.66%	965	27.57%	72	2.06%	53	1.51%	147	4.20%	1,298	37.09%	3,500
Rosebud	1,646	58.70%	1,027	36.63%	93	3.32%	4	0.14%	34	1.21%	619	22.08%	2,804
Sanders	1,577	60.63%	760	29.22%	250	9.61%	9	0.35%	5	0.19%	817	31.41%	2,601
Sheridan	1,450	44.67%	739	22.77%	109	3.36%	576	17.74%	372	11.46%	711	21.90%	3,246
Silver Bow	13,626	62.41%	6,792	31.11%	1,107	5.07%	282	1.29%	27	0.12%	6,834	31.30%	21,834
Stillwater	1,281	52.22%	1,085	44.23%	62	2.53%	20	0.82%	5	0.20%	196	7.99%	2,453
Sweet Grass	761	47.74%	784	49.18%	40	2.51%	0	0.00%	9	0.56%	-23	-1.44%	1,594
Teton	1,496	61.61%	875	36.04%	47	1.94%	4	0.16%	6	0.25%	621	25.58%	2,428
Toole	1,917	66.70%	862	29.99%	77	2.68%	5	0.17%	13	0.45%	1,055	36.71%	2,874
Treasure	310	52.01%	276	46.31%	5	0.84%	3	0.50%	2	0.34%	34	5.70%	596
Valley	2,499	61.07%	1,242	30.35%	128	3.13%	33	0.81%	190	4.64%	1,257	30.72%	4,092
Wheatland	996	54.22%	828	45.07%	9	0.49%	0	0.00%	4	0.22%	168	9.15%	1,837
Wibaux	798	63.69%	445	35.51%	9	0.72%	0	0.00%	1	0.08%	353	28.17%	1,253
Yellowstone	5,777	50.31%	5,386	46.90%	288	2.51%	25	0.22%	7	0.06%	391	3.41%	11,483
Totals	127,286	58.80%	78,078	36.07%	7,902	3.65%	1,755	0.81%	1,461	0.67%	49,208	22.73%	216,482

==== Counties that flipped from Republican to Democratic ====
- Beaverhead
- Broadwater
- Carbon
- Carter
- Cascade
- Custer
- Daniels
- Fallon
- Fergus
- Flathead
- Garfield
- Golden Valley
- Granite
- Hill
- Jefferson
- Judith Basin
- Lewis and Clark
- Liberty
- Lincoln
- Madison
- McCone
- Meagher
- Musselshell
- Park
- Petroleum
- Phillips
- Pondera
- Powder River
- Powell
- Prairie
- Ravalli
- Richland
- Rosebud
- Roosevelt
- Dawson
- Mineral
- Sheridan
- Gallatin
- Lake
- Chouteau
- Yellowstone
- Sanders
- Stillwater
- Teton
- Toole
- Treasure
- Valley
- Wheatland
- Wibaux
- Missoula
- Blaine
- Big Horn

== See also ==
- United States presidential elections in Montana
