= 1944 United States presidential election in Montana =

- November 7, 1944

Nominee	Franklin D. Roosevelt	Thomas E. Dewey
Party	Democratic	Republican
Home state	New York	New York
Running mate	Harry S. Truman	John W. Bricker
Electoral vote	4	0
Popular vote	112,556	93,163
Percentage	54.28%	44.93%
County results
Roosevelt
50–60%
60–70%
Dewey
50–60%
60–70%
President before election
Franklin D. Roosevelt
Democratic
Elected President
Franklin D. Roosevelt
Democratic

The 1944 United States presidential election in Montana took place on November 7, 1944, as part of the 1944 United States presidential election. Voters chose four representatives, or electors to the Electoral College, who voted for president and vice president.

Montana voted to give Democratic nominee, President Franklin D. Roosevelt a record fourth term, over the Republican nominee, New York Governor Thomas E. Dewey. Roosevelt won Montana by the substantial margin of 9.35%. This was the last occasion Gallatin County voted for a Democratic presidential candidate until Barack Obama carried the county in 2008, as well as the last time until that election that Montana would back a different presidential candidate than Colorado.

Roosevelt remains the last Democratic presidential candidate to have carried Montana more than once.

== Results ==
1944 United States presidential election in Montana
Party	Candidate	Votes	Percentage	Electoral votes
Democratic	Franklin D. Roosevelt (incumbent)	112,556	54.28%	4
Republican	Thomas E. Dewey	93,163	44.93%	0
Socialist	Norman Thomas	1,296	0.63%	0
Prohibition	Claude Watson	340	0.16%	0
Totals		207,355	100.00%	4

=== Results by county ===
County	Franklin Delano Roosevelt Democratic		Thomas Edmund Dewey Republican		Various candidates Other parties		Margin		Total votes cast
County	#	%	#	%	#	%	#	%	Total votes cast
Beaverhead	1,263	44.60%	1,556	54.94%	13	0.46%	-293	-10.35%	2,832
Big Horn	1,289	47.83%	1,394	51.73%	12	0.45%	-105	-3.90%	2,695
Blaine	1,469	59.26%	990	39.94%	20	0.81%	479	19.32%	2,479
Broadwater	558	42.18%	760	57.45%	5	0.38%	-202	-15.27%	1,323
Carbon	2,073	49.01%	2,126	50.26%	31	0.73%	-53	-1.25%	4,230
Carter	610	54.56%	507	45.35%	1	0.09%	103	9.21%	1,118
Cascade	10,924	62.65%	6,372	36.54%	141	0.81%	4,552	26.11%	17,437
Chouteau	1,906	60.45%	1,220	38.69%	27	0.86%	686	21.76%	3,153
Custer	2,038	52.30%	1,830	46.96%	29	0.74%	208	5.34%	3,897
Daniels	824	54.35%	680	44.85%	12	0.79%	144	9.50%	1,516
Dawson	1,362	46.53%	1,549	52.92%	16	0.55%	-187	-6.39%	2,927
Deer Lodge	4,347	66.31%	2,176	33.19%	33	0.50%	2,171	33.11%	6,556
Fallon	494	36.03%	870	63.46%	7	0.51%	-376	-27.43%	1,371
Fergus	3,164	58.35%	2,229	41.11%	29	0.53%	935	17.24%	5,422
Flathead	3,608	46.34%	4,066	52.22%	112	1.44%	-458	-5.88%	7,786
Gallatin	3,479	52.46%	3,120	47.04%	33	0.50%	359	5.41%	6,632
Garfield	478	46.27%	553	53.53%	2	0.19%	-75	-7.26%	1,033
Glacier	2,142	63.39%	1,228	36.34%	9	0.27%	914	27.05%	3,379
Golden Valley	266	40.18%	395	59.67%	1	0.15%	-129	-19.49%	662
Granite	574	44.57%	702	54.50%	12	0.93%	-128	-9.94%	1,288
Hill	2,986	63.95%	1,646	35.25%	37	0.79%	1,340	28.70%	4,669
Jefferson	803	50.09%	797	49.72%	3	0.19%	6	0.37%	1,603
Judith Basin	1,049	60.05%	691	39.55%	7	0.40%	358	20.49%	1,747
Lake	1,750	43.11%	2,265	55.80%	44	1.08%	-515	-12.69%	4,059
Lewis and Clark	4,737	51.17%	4,482	48.41%	39	0.42%	255	2.75%	9,258
Liberty	440	52.26%	393	46.67%	9	1.07%	47	5.58%	842
Lincoln	1,445	55.81%	1,109	42.84%	35	1.35%	336	12.98%	2,589
Madison	1,022	44.19%	1,278	55.25%	13	0.56%	-256	-11.07%	2,313
McCone	763	57.80%	526	39.85%	31	2.35%	237	17.95%	1,320
Meagher	482	48.54%	509	51.26%	2	0.20%	-27	-2.72%	993
Mineral	401	50.63%	380	47.98%	11	1.39%	21	2.65%	792
Missoula	5,558	50.40%	5,371	48.70%	99	0.90%	187	1.70%	11,028
Musselshell	1,342	56.51%	1,004	42.27%	29	1.22%	338	14.23%	2,375
Park	2,245	48.00%	2,396	51.23%	36	0.77%	-151	-3.23%	4,677
Petroleum	225	46.78%	253	52.60%	3	0.62%	-28	-5.82%	481
Phillips	1,435	56.43%	1,089	42.82%	19	0.75%	346	13.61%	2,543
Pondera	1,448	61.33%	890	37.70%	23	0.97%	558	23.63%	2,361
Powder River	476	41.86%	650	57.17%	11	0.97%	-174	-15.30%	1,137
Powell	1,527	57.73%	1,100	41.59%	18	0.68%	427	16.14%	2,645
Prairie	468	43.58%	598	55.68%	8	0.74%	-130	-12.10%	1,074
Ravalli	1,926	44.68%	2,342	54.33%	43	1.00%	-416	-9.65%	4,311
Richland	1,777	56.22%	1,347	42.61%	37	1.17%	430	13.60%	3,161
Roosevelt	1,848	58.33%	1,281	40.44%	39	1.23%	567	17.90%	3,168
Rosebud	1,114	48.41%	1,154	50.15%	33	1.43%	-40	-1.74%	2,301
Sanders	1,184	51.98%	1,070	46.97%	24	1.05%	114	5.00%	2,278
Sheridan	1,713	67.23%	791	31.04%	44	1.73%	922	36.19%	2,548
Silver Bow	13,228	62.87%	7,610	36.17%	202	0.96%	5,618	26.70%	21,040
Stillwater	934	43.60%	1,201	56.07%	7	0.33%	-267	-12.46%	2,142
Sweet Grass	533	37.01%	897	62.29%	10	0.69%	-364	-25.28%	1,440
Teton	1,508	57.98%	1,074	41.29%	19	0.73%	434	16.69%	2,601
Toole	1,545	57.91%	1,113	41.72%	10	0.37%	432	16.19%	2,668
Treasure	282	49.21%	287	50.09%	4	0.70%	-5	-0.87%	573
Valley	2,196	61.31%	1,341	37.44%	45	1.26%	855	23.87%	3,582
Wheatland	733	48.35%	767	50.59%	16	1.06%	-34	-2.24%	1,516
Wibaux	425	49.48%	432	50.29%	2	0.23%	-7	-0.81%	859
Yellowstone	8,140	48.09%	8,706	51.44%	79	0.47%	-566	-3.34%	16,925
Totals	112,556	54.28%	93,163	44.93%	1,636	0.79%	19,393	9.35%	207,355

==== Counties that flipped from Democratic to Republican ====
- Big Horn
- Carbon
- Broadwater
- Dawson
- Garfield
- Flathead
- Granite
- Madison
- Meagher
- Park
- Petroleum
- Ravalli
- Rosebud
- Wibaux
- Treasure
- Wheatland
- Yellowstone

== See also ==
- United States presidential elections in Montana
