= Butchertown, Casey County, Kentucky =

Butchertown
- Unincorporated community
- Location within the state of Kentucky Butchertown (the United States)
- Coordinates: 37°30′41″N 84°53′26″W
- Country: United States
- State: Kentucky
- County: Casey
- Elevation: 997 ft (304 m)
- Time zone: UTC-6 (Central (CST))
  - Summer (DST): UTC-5 (CST)
- GNIS feature ID: 507630

Butchertown is an unincorporated community in Casey County, Kentucky, United States.
