= Terry Vermeire =

American politician

Member of the Montana Senate from the 39th district
- Incumbent
- Assumed office January 2, 2022
- Preceded by: Jessica Wicks

Personal details
- Party: Republican

Terry Vermeire is an American politician serving as a member of the Montana Senate for the 39th district from January 4, 2023.

== Early life and career ==
Vermeire moved to Anaconda, Montana in 1977 and found employment with Montana Power, where he worked for 25 years. After retiring, Vermeire worked part-time as a graphic designer. He was later elected to the Anaconda-Deer Lodge County Commission.

In 2022, following the death of State Senator Mark Sweeney, Vermeire was nominated as the Republican candidate in a special election to fill the remainder of Sweeney's term.

Vermeire won the election against Democratic candidate Jesse Mullen, a newspaper executive from Deer Lodge, Montana. He serves in the 68th session of the Montana Legislature.
