= List of lakes of Deer Lodge County, Montana =

There are at least 25 named lakes and reservoirs in Deer Lodge County, Montana.

== Lakes ==
- Barker Lakes, 46°06′09″N 113°07′18″W, el. 7,953 feet (2,424 m)
- Daly Lake, 46°10′32″N 113°14′34″W, el. 6,424 feet (1,958 m)
- Emerald Lake, 46°01′01″N 113°16′29″W, el. 8,963 feet (2,732 m)
- Fourmile Basin Lakes, 46°05′22″N 113°14′08″W, el. 8,195 feet (2,498 m)
- Haggin Lake, 46°06′10″N 113°05′30″W, el. 8,107 feet (2,471 m)
- Hearst Lake, 46°05′47″N 113°04′16″W, el. 8,199 feet (2,499 m)
- Hicks Lake (Montana), 46°00′11″N 113°21′07″W, el. 8,760 feet (2,670 m)
- Lake of the Isle, 46°04′22″N 113°11′17″W, el. 8,340 feet (2,540 m)
- LaMarche Lake, 46°00′44″N 113°18′06″W, el. 8,261 feet (2,518 m)
- Lost Lakes, 45°57′37″N 113°22′57″W, el. 9,567 feet (2,916 m)
- Lower Seymour Lake, 45°59′06″N 113°11′07″W, el. 6,758 feet (2,060 m)
- Miller Lake, 46°04′24″N 113°08′29″W, el. 8,428 feet (2,569 m)
- Mudd Lake, 45°54′42″N 113°24′59″W, el. 7,641 feet (2,329 m)
- Oreamnos Lake, 45°56′32″N 113°30′20″W, el. 8,366 feet (2,550 m)
- Pintler Lake, 45°50′26″N 113°26′28″W, el. 6,306 feet (1,922 m)
- Rainbow Lake, 45°57′28″N 113°27′12″W, el. 8,218 feet (2,505 m)
- Tenmile Lakes, 46°02′45″N 113°08′27″W, el. 8,740 feet (2,660 m)
- Toomey Lake, 45°49′06″N 113°18′21″W, el. 5,889 feet (1,795 m)
- Twin Lakes, 46°04′54″N 113°12′44″W, el. 7,615 feet (2,321 m)
- Upper Seymour Lake, 46°02′12″N 113°16′12″W, el. 8,261 feet (2,518 m)
- Warren Lake, 45°58′37″N 113°25′04″W, el. 8,468 feet (2,581 m)

== Reservoirs ==
- Georgetown Lake, 46°12′55″N 113°16′50″W, el. 6,361 feet (1,939 m)
- Silver Lake, 46°10′12″N 113°14′09″W, el. 6,437 feet (1,962 m)
- Storm Lake, 46°04′28″N 113°16′04″W, el. 8,186 feet (2,495 m)
- Thornton Lake, 46°15′36″N 113°02′03″W, el. 7,569 feet (2,307 m)

== See also ==
- List of lakes in Montana
