= Walkerville, Montana =

- Town
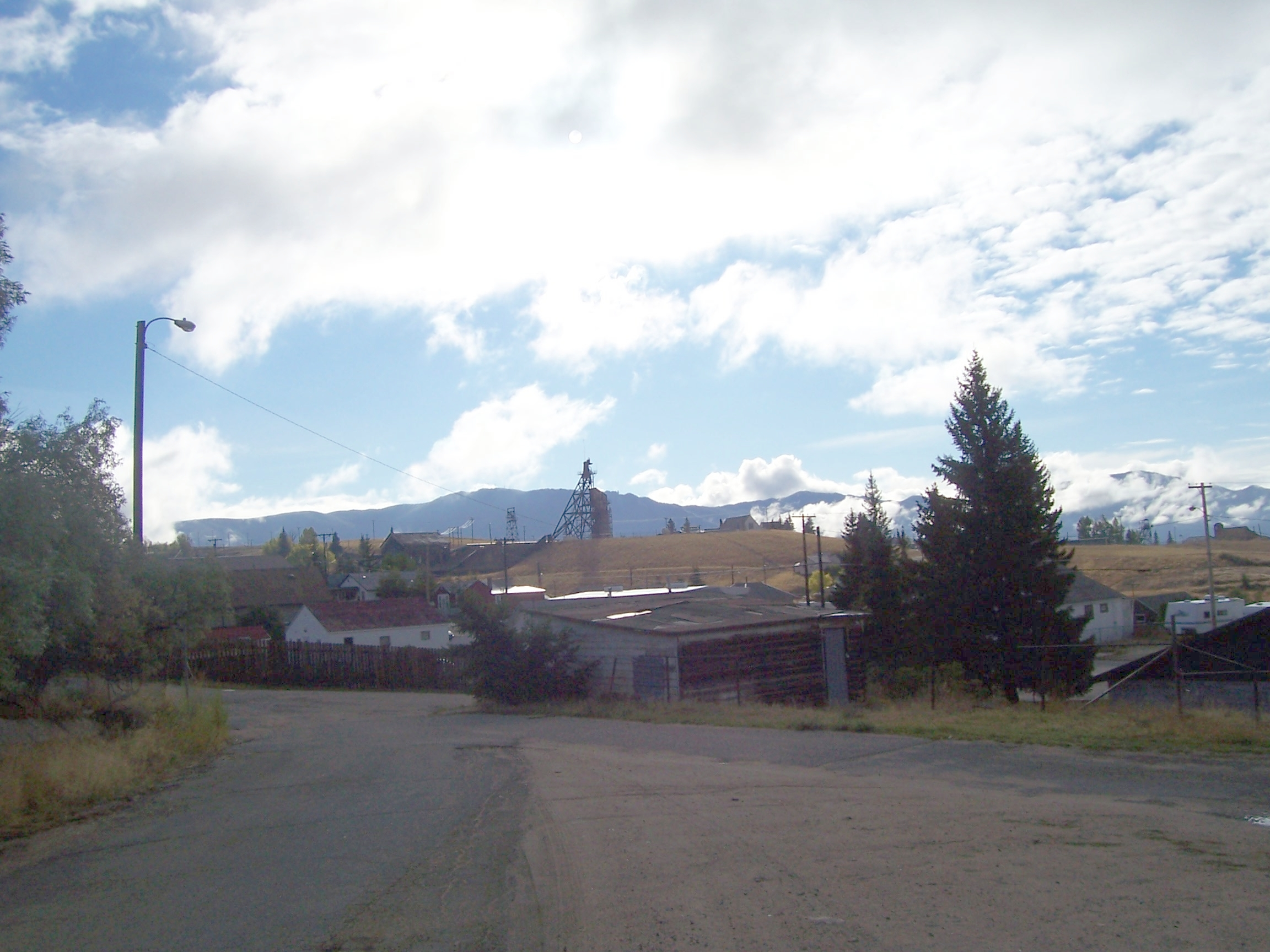
- Lexington Mine in Walkerville

- Location of Walkerville in Silver Bow County, Montana

- Location within Montana Location within the United States
- Coordinates: 46°02′12″N 112°32′22″W
- Country: United States
- State: Montana
- County: Silver Bow

Area
  - Total: 2.23 sq mi (5.77 km^{2})
  - Land: 2.23 sq mi (5.77 km^{2})
  - Water: 0 sq mi (0.00 km^{2})
- Elevation: 6,296 ft (1,919 m)

Population (2020)
  - Total: 639
  - Density: 287.0/sq mi (110.81/km^{2})
- Time zone: UTC-7 (Mountain (MST))
  - Summer (DST): UTC-6 (MDT)
- ZIP code: 59701
- Area code: 406
- FIPS code: 30-77650
- GNIS feature ID: 2413442
- Website: www.walkervillemt.gov

Walkerville is a town in Silver Bow County, Montana, United States, that is an enclave of the consolidated city-county of Butte. The population was 639 at the 2020 census. Walkerville is a suburb of Butte, and the only other incorporated community in the county, as well as the only part of the county that is not part of Butte.

Part of Walkerville is included in the Butte-Anaconda Historic District. Walkerville represents some of the earliest mines in the district and preserves the early mining camp flavor present in the 1890s to 1910s.

== History ==
Walkerville is a suburb of Butte, Montana and is home to some of the earliest mining sites in the area. These sites attracted many investors to Walkerville in the late 1800s. Walkerville is named for four of those investors: brothers Joseph, Samuel, Matthew and David Walker of Salt Lake City; they had purchased the lucrative Alice mine upon recommendation by their agent (and later Copper King) Marcus Daly.

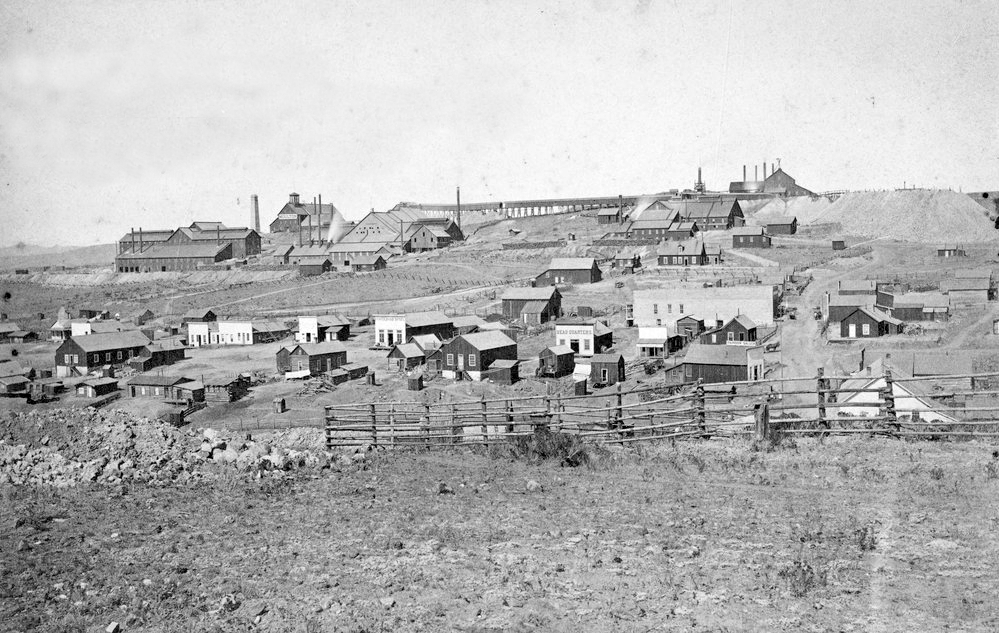
Walkerville, 1881

There were many different types of materials mined depending on the location of a given site. Copper and silver were two of the most commonly mined materials. In 1893, silver prices dropped, but the town's economy continued to thrive due to its copper production. The town incorporated in 1890, and by the early 1900s almost 2,500 people lived there, mostly Cornish and Irish immigrants who came to work in the mines. Walkerville's economic success continued until 1918 when the end of World War I caused copper prices to drop.

In 1955, the Anaconda Company decided to begin open-pit mining operations, which transformed Walkerville. Residents opposed open-pit mining on the grounds that it took away jobs. But extracting metals was cheaper with the open pit method, and as copper prices dropped after World War II, the old Alice Mine transformed into the Alice Pit. Blasting in the pit, located in the middle of Walkerville, angered residents who complained of noise, flying rocks, and cracking basements. The Anaconda Company offered to buy property at fair market prices and sold homes back to residents for one dollar on the stipulation that the home be moved. Many residents moved away. When the blasting and digging rendered Sibyl, Rose, and Pearl streets impassable, they were condemned and fenced off. Mayor Jimmy Shea responded by demanding that the Company formally petition the city council to discontinue and vacate the streets. With this leverage, the city council demanded the Company pay to repair city utilities, build a new road, repair damaged streets, build safety fences, keep the pit one hundred feet from homes, and build a new ballpark. Eventually, the Company acquiesced to most of these demands. Even so, Walkerville's fight with the Company became more bitter as the pit continued to expand. In 1961, the City of Walkerville sued Anaconda for damaging city property. The Alice Pit never reopened.

By 2015, nearly all of the town's many mines are abandoned. Some of these sites have become very dangerous and plans are being made to restore or remove them.

== Geography ==
Berkeley Pit is 2 miles (3.2 km) to the south. The town is on the U.S. Continental Divide.

According to the United States Census Bureau, the town has a total area of 2.23 square miles (5.78 km^{2}), all land.

=== Neighborhoods ===
- Corktown
- Sun View Terrace
- Seldom Seen
- Dewey's Point
- Chicken Flat
- Butchertown
- the Corra

Butchertown was named for Rollo Butcher, Walkerville's first permanent resident.

== Demographics ==
Historical population
Census	Pop.	Note	%±
1880	444		—
1890	1,743		292.6%
1900	2,621		50.4%
1910	2,491		−5.0%
1920	2,391		−4.0%
1930	2,052		−14.2%
1940	1,880		−8.4%
1950	1,631		−13.2%
1960	1,453		−10.9%
1970	1,097		−24.5%
1980	887		−19.1%
1990	605		−31.8%
2000	714		18.0%
2010	675		−5.5%
2020	639		−5.3%
U.S. Decennial Census

=== 2010 census ===
As of the census of 2010, there were 675 people, 304 households, and 175 families residing in the town. The population density was 302.7 inhabitants per square mile (116.9/km^{2}). There were 344 housing units at an average density of 154.3 per square mile (59.6/km^{2}). The racial makeup of the town was 93.2% White, 0.1% African American, 3.3% Native American, 0.6% Asian, 0.3% Pacific Islander, 0.3% from other races, and 2.2% from two or more races. Hispanic or Latino of any race were 3.9% of the population.

There were 304 households, of which 27.6% had children under the age of 18 living with them, 41.4% were married couples living together, 10.2% had a female householder with no husband present, 5.9% had a male householder with no wife present, and 42.4% were non-families. 35.2% of all households were made up of individuals, and 13.2% had someone living alone who was 65 years of age or older. The average household size was 2.22 and the average family size was 2.90.

The median age in the town was 44.2 years. 22.4% of residents were under the age of 18; 8.6% were between the ages of 18 and 24; 20.3% were from 25 to 44; 33.8% were from 45 to 64; and 15% were 65 years of age or older. The gender makeup of the town was 48.6% male and 51.4% female.

=== 2000 census ===
As of the census of 2000, there were 714 people, 297 households, and 195 families residing in the town. The population density was 325.1 inhabitants per square mile (125.5/km^{2}). There were 343 housing units at an average density of 156.2 per square mile (60.3/km^{2}). The racial makeup of the town was 94.26% White, 0.14% African American, 4.06% Native American, 0.28% Asian, 0.70% from other races, and 0.56% from two or more races. Hispanic or Latino of any race were 3.22% of the population.

There were 297 households, out of which 31.3% had children under the age of 18 living with them, 49.5% were married couples living together, 11.1% had a female householder with no husband present, and 34.3% were non-families. 30.6% of all households were made up of individuals, and 11.4% had someone living alone who was 65 years of age or older. The average household size was 2.40 and the average family size was 3.00.

In the town, the population was spread out, with 25.5% under the age of 18, 8.7% from 18 to 24, 27.3% from 25 to 44, 25.5% from 45 to 64, and 13.0% who were 65 years of age or older. The median age was 37 years. For every 100 females there were 97.8 males. For every 100 females age 18 and over, there were 102.3 males.

The median income for a household in the town was $28,009, and the median income for a family was $29,861. Males had a median income of $27,404 versus $19,063 for females. The per capita income for the town was $14,156. About 9.9% of families and 12.1% of the population were below the poverty line, including 18.8% of those under age 18 and 5.0% of those age 65 or over.

== Government ==
The Town Council is composed of four aldermen and a mayor. John W. Ries has been mayor since December 2011. He was unopposed in the November 2025 election.

== Education ==
The municipality is in the Butte Elementary School District and Butte High School District. Butte Public Schools has two components: Butte Elementary School District and Butte High School District.

== Media ==
The FM radio station KMTZ is licensed in Walkerville. It plays adult hits.

== See also ==
- List of municipalities in Montana
