= 1892 United States presidential election in Montana =

- November 8, 1892
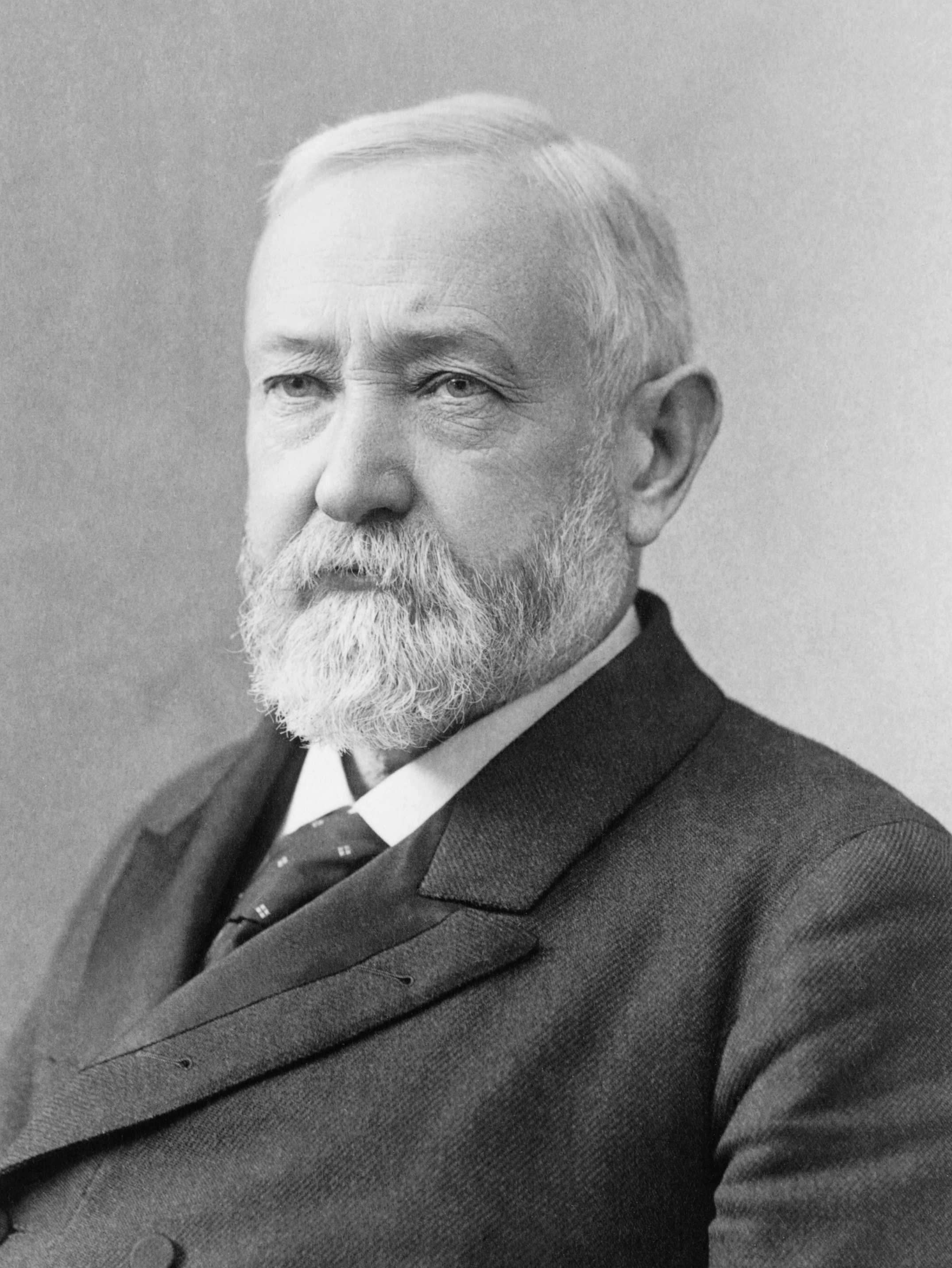

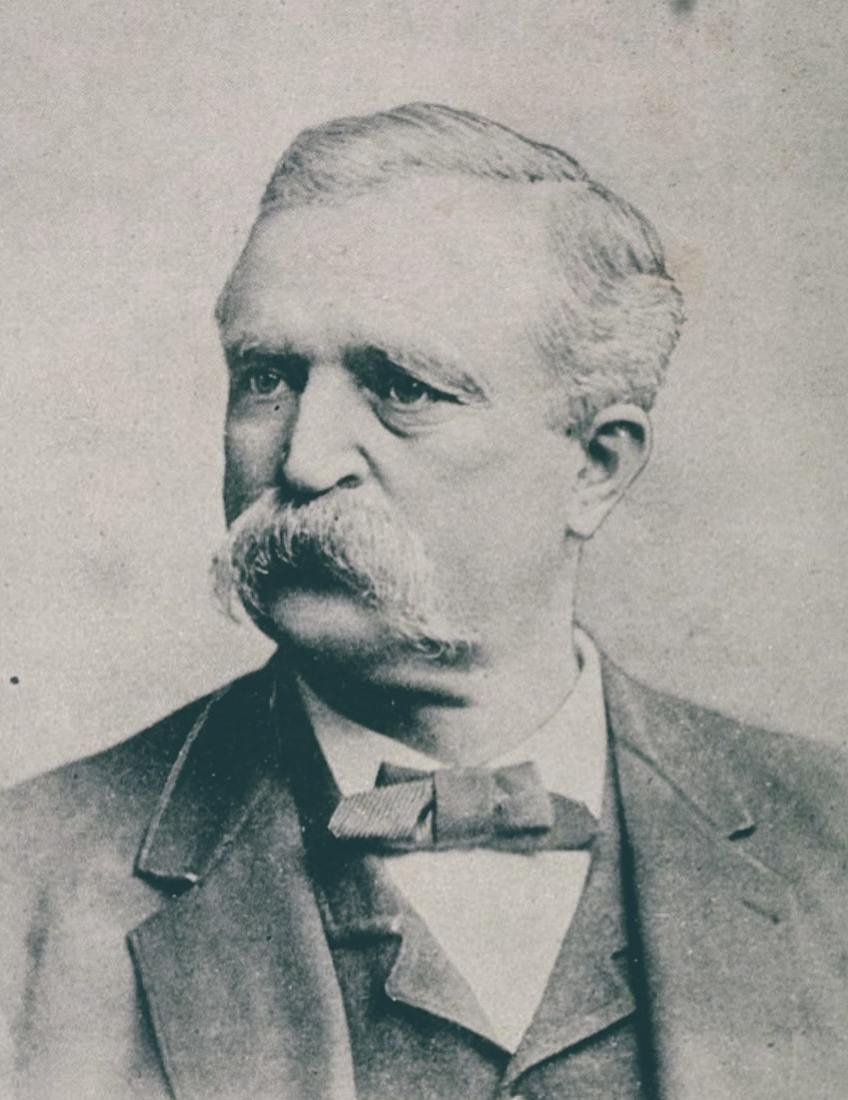
Nominee	Benjamin Harrison	Grover Cleveland	James B. Weaver
Party	Republican	Democratic	Populist
Home state	Indiana	New York	Iowa
Running mate	Whitelaw Reid	Adlai Stevenson I	James G. Field
Electoral vote	3	0	0
Popular vote	18,851	17,581	7,334
Percentage	42.54%	39.67%	16.55%
County results
Harrison
30–40%
40–50%
50–60%
Cleveland
30–40%
40–50%
President before election
Benjamin Harrison
Republican
Elected President
Grover Cleveland
Democratic

The 1892 United States presidential election in Montana took place on November 8, 1892, as part of the 1892 United States presidential election. Voters chose three representatives, or electors to the Electoral College, who voted for president and vice president.

Montana participated in its first-ever presidential election, having become the 41st state on November 8, 1889. The state voted for the Republican nominee, incumbent president Benjamin Harrison, over the Democratic nominee, former president Grover Cleveland, who was running for a second, non-consecutive term and over the People's Party (Populists) nominee James B. Weaver. Harrison won Montana by a narrow margin of 2.87%.

Cleveland is the only Democrat to win the White House without carrying Silver Bow County.

== Results ==
General Election Results
Party	Pledged to	Elector	Votes
Republican Party	Benjamin Harrison	William E. Hall	18,851
Republican Party	Benjamin Harrison	George W. Morse	18,759
Republican Party	Benjamin Harrison	Francis M. Malone	18,753
Democratic Party	Grover Cleveland	Walter Cooper	17,581
Democratic Party	Grover Cleveland	Paul A. Fusz	17,437
Democratic Party	Grover Cleveland	Ambrose W. Lyman	17,352
People's Party	James B. Weaver	Daniel McKay	7,334
People's Party	James B. Weaver	John W. Rose	7,212
People's Party	James B. Weaver	Solomon Wiles	7,146
Prohibition Party	John Bidwell	Massena Bullard	549
Prohibition Party	John Bidwell	William C. Orr	510
Prohibition Party	John Bidwell	George W. Highsmith	507
Votes cast (Note: Based on totals for highest elector on each ticket)			44,315

=== Results by county ===
County	Benjamin Harrison Republican		Grover Cleveland Democratic		James B. Weaver People's		John Bidwell Prohibition		Margin		Total votes cast
County	#	%	#	%	#	%	#	%	#	%	Total votes cast
Beaverhead	729	53.33%	463	33.87%	155	11.34%	20	1.46%	266	19.46%	1,367
Cascade	1,295	45.22%	1,184	41.34%	337	11.77%	48	1.68%	111	3.88%	2,864
Chouteau	788	51.91%	676	44.53%	35	2.31%	19	1.25%	112	7.38%	1,518
Custer	680	52.67%	537	41.60%	66	5.11%	8	0.62%	143	11.07%	1,291
Dawson	343	53.43%	268	41.74%	23	3.58%	8	1.25%	75	11.69%	642
Deer Lodge	1,930	35.47%	2,152	39.55%	1,319	24.24%	40	0.74%	-222	-4.08%	5,441
Fergus	766	55.59%	560	40.64%	31	2.25%	21	1.52%	206	14.95%	1,378
Gallatin	998	43.32%	1,144	49.65%	80	3.47%	82	3.56%	-146	-6.33%	2,304
Jefferson	740	38.05%	730	37.53%	447	22.98%	28	1.44%	10	0.52%	1,945
Lewis and Clark	2,014	38.14%	2,093	39.64%	1,073	20.32%	100	1.89%	-79	-1.50%	5,280
Madison	762	48.81%	634	40.61%	151	9.67%	14	0.90%	128	8.20%	1,561
Meagher	839	44.63%	735	39.10%	292	15.53%	14	0.74%	104	5.53%	1,880
Missoula	2,045	39.82%	2,340	45.56%	706	13.75%	45	0.88%	-295	-5.74%	5,136
Park	1,192	49.81%	1,048	43.79%	123	5.14%	30	1.25%	144	6.02%	2,393
Silver Bow	3,251	38.58%	2,648	31.43%	2,473	29.35%	54	0.64%	603	7.15%	8,426
Yellowstone	479	53.88%	369	41.51%	23	2.59%	18	2.02%	110	12.37%	889
Totals	18,851	42.54%	17,581	39.67%	7,334	16.55%	549	1.24%	1,270	2.87%	44,315

== See also ==
- United States presidential elections in Montana
