= National Register of Historic Places listings in Sanders County, Montana =

Location of Sanders County in Montana

This is a list of the National Register of Historic Places listings in Sanders County, Montana. It is intended to be a complete list of the properties and districts on the National Register of Historic Places in Sanders County, Montana, United States. The locations of National Register properties and districts for which the latitude and longitude coordinates are included below, may be seen in a map.

There are 23 properties and districts listed on the National Register in the county.

This National Park Service list is complete through NPS recent listings posted August 28, 2026.

== Listings county-wide ==
	Name on the Register	Image	Date listed	Location	City or town	Description
1	Ainsworth House	Ainsworth House	October 7, 1986 (#86002771)	911 Maiden Ln. 47°35′43″N 115°21′19″W	Thompson Falls	
2	Bedard House	Bedard House	October 7, 1986 (#86002783)	207 Spruce St. 47°35′50″N 115°20′43″W	Thompson Falls	
3	Bull River Guard Station	Bull River Guard Station	June 27, 1990 (#90000990)	On the banks of the Bull River near its confluence with the E. Fork Bull River in the Kootenai National Forest; 48°06′24″N 115°46′40″W	Noxon	
4	Cougar Peak Lookout		August 6, 2018 (#100002774)	Plains / Thompson Falls Ranger District, Lolo NF; 47°44′41″N 115°23′01″W	Thompson Falls vicinity	
5	Gem Saloon	Gem Saloon	October 7, 1986 (#86002767)	808 Main St. 47°35′40″N 115°20′45″W	Thompson Falls	
6	Grandchamp House	Grandchamp House	October 7, 1986 (#86002776)	1012 Preston Ave. 47°35′51″N 115°21′10″W	Thompson Falls	
7	Griffen House	Griffen House	October 7, 1986 (#86002779)	205 Gallatin St. 47°35′53″N 115°21′04″W	Thompson Falls	
8	House at 112 Park Street	House at 112 Park Street	October 7, 1986 (#86002778)	112 Park St. 47°35′51″N 115°21′07″W	Thompson Falls	
9	House at 916 Preston Avenue	House at 916 Preston Avenue	October 7, 1986 (#86002777)	916 Preston Ave. 47°35′49″N 115°21′07″W	Thompson Falls	
10	Hoyt House	Hoyt House	October 7, 1986 (#86002780)	204 Gallatin St. 47°35′52″N 115°20′59″W	Thompson Falls	
11	IOOF Lodge	IOOF Lodge	October 7, 1986 (#86002761)	520 Main St. 47°35′35″N 115°20′31″W	Thompson Falls	
12	Norby House		October 7, 1986 (#86002775)	13 Pond St. 47°35′48″N 115°21′19″W	Thompson Falls	Demolished, replaced by bank.
13	Northern Pacific Warehouse	Northern Pacific Warehouse	October 7, 1986 (#86002785)	Bounded by Preston Ave. and Main St. along the Burlington Northern right-of-way 47°35′42″N 115°20′33″W	Thompson Falls	
14	Paradise School	Paradise School	March 5, 2021 (#100006231)	2 Schoolhouse Hill Rd. 47°23′14″N 114°47′44″W	Paradise	
15	Preston House	Preston House	October 7, 1986 (#86002784)	205 Ferry St. 47°35′45″N 115°20′30″W	Thompson Falls	
16	Rinard House	Rinard House	October 7, 1986 (#86002782)	210 Jefferson St. 47°35′50″N 115°20′50″W	Thompson Falls	
17	Sanders County Jail	Sanders County Jail	October 7, 1986 (#86002774)	Madison and Maiden Lane; 47°35′42″N 115°21′00″W	Thompson Falls	
18	Symes Hotel	Symes Hotel	November 12, 1998 (#98001363)	209 N. Wall St. 47°36′37″N 114°40′16″W	Hot Springs	
19	Thayer House	Thayer House	December 22, 1986 (#86002781)	109 Jefferson St. 47°35′49″N 115°20′54″W	Thompson Falls	
20	Thompson Falls Hydroelectric Dam Historic District	Thompson Falls Hydroelectric Dam Historic District	October 7, 1986 (#86002756)	Alternate U.S. Route 10 at the Clark Fork River within the northwestern part of Thompson Falls; 47°35′38″N 115°21′25″W	Thompson Falls	Boundary adjustments approved on July 6, 2022
21	Tourist Hotel	Tourist Hotel	October 7, 1986 (#86002765)	101 Main St. 47°35′40″N 115°20′41″W	Thompson Falls	
22	Ward Hotel	Ward Hotel	December 22, 1986 (#86002769)	919 Main St. 47°35′41″N 115°20′48″W	Thompson Falls	
23	Weber's Store	Weber's Store	October 7, 1986 (#86002763)	510 Main St. 47°35′37″N 115°20′34″W	Thompson Falls	

== See also ==
- List of National Historic Landmarks in Montana
- National Register of Historic Places listings in Montana
