= Hoyt House =

Hoyt House may refer to:

in the United States (by state then town)

- Hoyt-Scott House, Point Arena, California, listed on the National Register of Historic Places (NRHP) in Mendocino County
- Benjamin Hait House, Stamford, Connecticut, also known as Hoyt House, NRHP-listed
- Hoyt-Barnum House, Stamford, Connecticut, NRHP-listed
- Lyman and Asenath Hoyt House, Lancaster, Indiana, NRHP-listed in Jefferson County
- Benjamin Hoyt House, Cambridge, Massachusetts, NRHP-listed
- Hoyt-Shedd Estate, Lowell, Massachusetts, NRHP-listed
- E. S. Hoyt House, Red Wing, Minnesota, NRHP-listed
- Hoyt House (Thompson Falls, Montana), NRHP-listed in Sanders County
- Samuel P. Hoyt House, Hoytsville, Utah, NRHP-listed in Summit County
