= Preston Farm =

Preston Farm may refer to:

- Preston Farm (Fort Collins, Colorado), listed on the National Register of Historic Places in Larimer County, Colorado
- Preston Farm (Kingsport, Tennessee), listed on the National Register of Historic Places in Sullivan County, Tennessee
- Preston-Lafreniere Farm, Bolton, Vermont, listed on the National Register of Historic Places in Chittenden County, Vermont

== See also ==
- Preston House (disambiguation)
- Preston Hall (disambiguation)
