= Thompson Falls Women's Club =

Historic house in Montana, United States

- Rinard House
- U.S. National Register of Historic Places
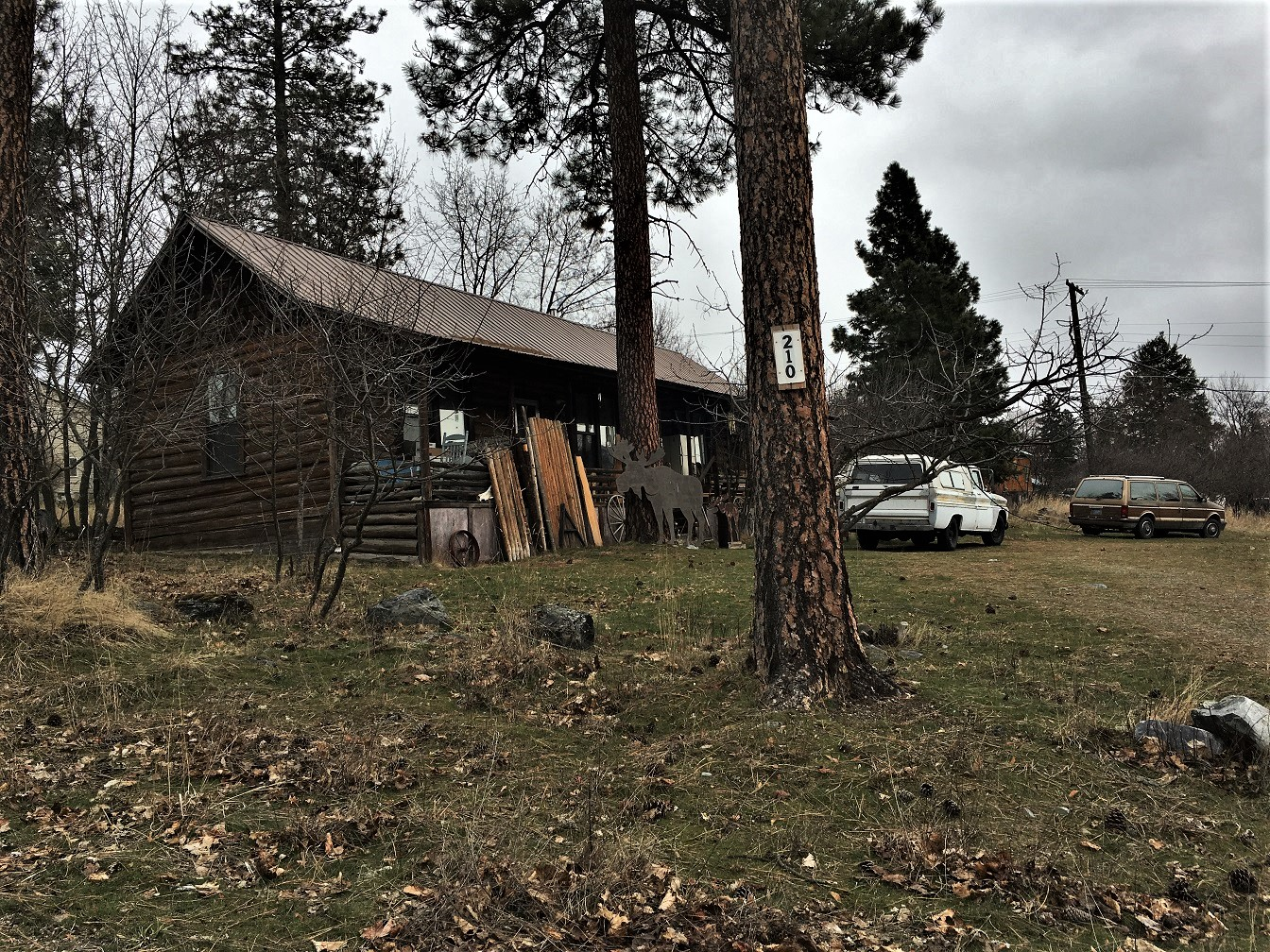

- Location within Montana Location within the United States
- Location: 210 Jefferson St., Thompson Falls, Montana
- Coordinates: 47°35′50″N 115°20′50″W
- Area: less than one acre
- MPS: Thompson Falls MRA
- NRHP reference No.: 86002782
- Added to NRHP: October 7, 1986

The Thompson Falls Women's Club, which has also been known as the Rinard House, at 210 Jefferson St. in Thompson Falls in Sanders County, Montana, was listed on the National Register of Historic Places in 1986.

The building is significant for its association with the women's club which was founded in 1914.

It is a one-story wood-frame building with a log and stone exterior. It was built in 1910 as a three-room house, and it was home for Leonard Rinard, an attorney who was County Clerk and Recorder, until he sold it in 1914. It was acquired by the Women's Club in 1928.

The Woman's Club originally convened at the home of M.V. Brown, its president. It was reorganized in 1921 "as a non-sectarian and non-political organization, where women in Thompson Falls 'can come and discuss issues and measures with the purpose of benefitting every man, woman and child in the community.' Together with other organizations the club organized a child welfare clinic in 1922. It helped organize a community bathhouse, a community swimming pool, and the Sanders County Historical Library.

== See also ==
- List of women's clubs
- National Register of Historic Places listings in Sanders County, Montana
