= Preston House =

Preston House may refer to:

- Preston School of Industry, Ione, California, also known as Preston Castle and listed as the latter on the NRHP in Amador County, California
- Preston Farm (Fort Collins, Colorado), listed on the National Register of Historic Places in Larimer County, Colorado
- Preston Bungalow, Paris, Idaho, listed on the NRHP in Bear Lake County, Idaho
- Maj. Walter Preston House, Becknerville, Kentucky, listed on the NRHP in Clark County, Kentucky
- Preston House (Milton, Kentucky) on the National Register of Historic Places listings in Trimble County, Kentucky
- Preston-on-the-Patuxent, Johnstown, Maryland, listed on the NRHP in Calvert County, Maryland
- White-Preston House, Danvers, Massachusetts, listed on the NRHP in Essex County, Massachusetts
- Preston House (Thompson Falls, Montana) on the National Register of Historic Places listings in Sanders County, Montana
- Stillwell-Preston House, Saddle River, New Jersey, listed on the NRHP in Bergen County, New Jersey
- Charles Preston House, Seaside, Oregon, listed on the NRHP in Clatsop County, Oregon
- Hampton-Preston House, Columbia, South Carolina, listed on the NRHP in Richland County, South Carolina
- Preston Farm (Kingsport, Tennessee), listed on the National Register of Historic Places in Sullivan County, Tennessee
- Thaddeus and Josepha Preston House, Paris, Texas, listed on the NRHP in Lamar County, Texas
- Preston-Lafreniere Farm, Bolton, Vermont, listed on the National Register of Historic Places in Chittenden County, Vermont
- Preston House (Marion, Virginia) on the National Register of Historic Places listings in Smyth County, Virginia
- Preston House (Salem, Virginia) on the National Register of Historic Places listings in Salem, Virginia
- Preston House (Saltville, Virginia) on the National Register of Historic Places listings in Smyth County, Virginia
- Preston Community Clubhouse, Preston, Washington, listed on the NRHP in King County, Washington
- Preston Hall (Waitsburg, Washington), listed on the NRHP in Walla Walla County, Washington

== See also ==
- Preston Hall (disambiguation)
- Preston Farm (disambiguation)
