= Norby House =

Historic house in Montana, United States

- U.S. National Register of Historic Places
- Location within Montana Location within the United States
- Location: 13 Pond St., Thompson Falls, Montana
- Coordinates: 47°35′48″N 115°21′19″W
- Area: 2.8 acres (1.1 ha)
- Built: 1912
- Built by: Doenges, Charles H.
- Architectural style: Bungalow/craftsman
- MPS: Thompson Falls MRA
- NRHP reference No.: 86002775
- Added to NRHP: October 7, 1986

Norby House, at 13 Pond St. in Thompson Falls in Sanders County, Montana, was built in 1912. It was listed on the National Register of Historic Places in 1986.

It was built by Charles H. Doenges for Dr. J. B. Norby. It is a bungalow/craftsman style house built on a concrete foundation. It has a hipped roof and an original enclosed screen porch.
