= Preston Manor =

Preston Manor may refer to:

- Preston, London, also known as Preston Manor
  - Preston Manor High School
- Preston Manor, Brighton

== See also ==
- Preston House (disambiguation)
