= Tourist Hotel =

- U.S. National Register of Historic Places
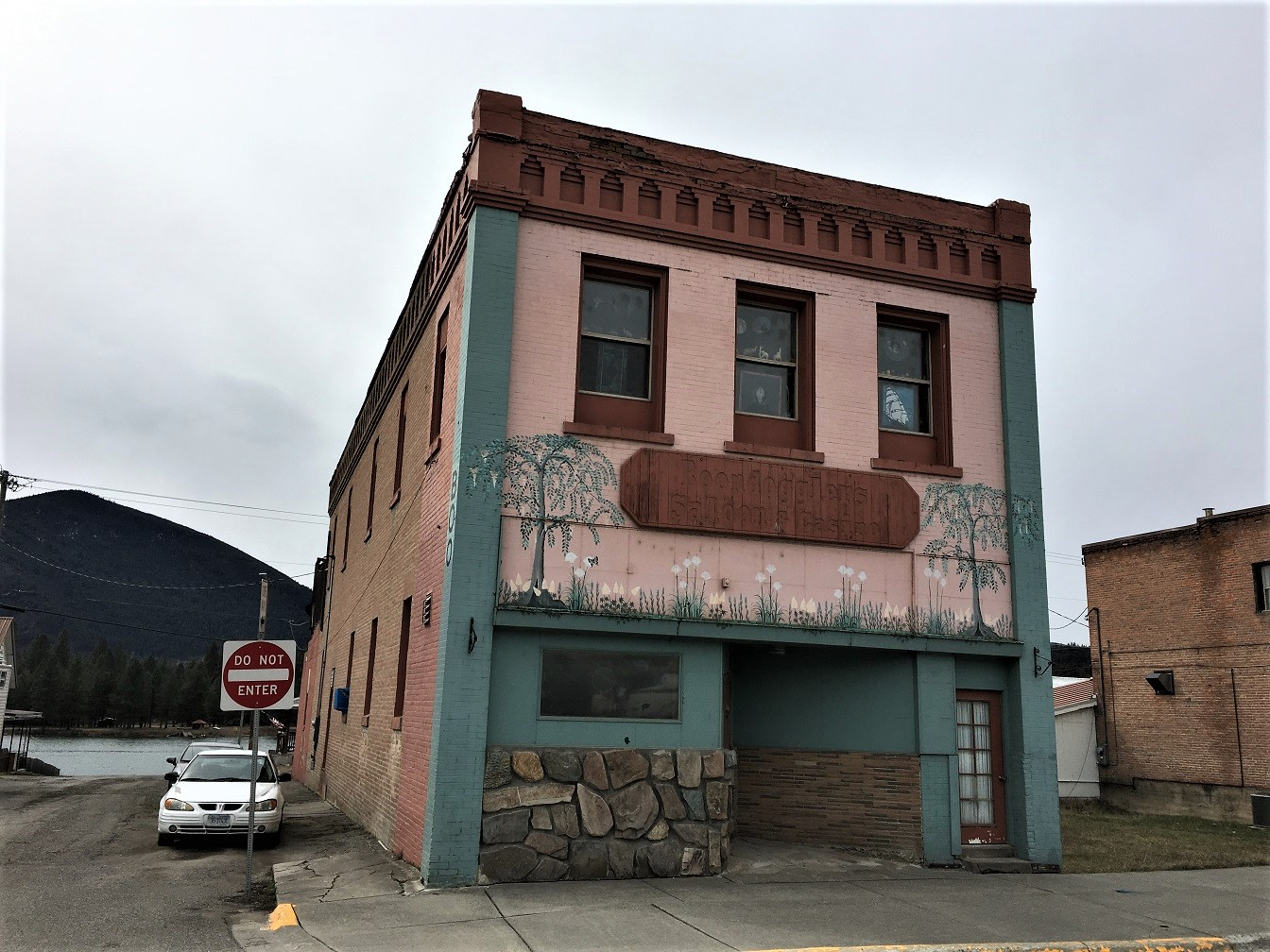

- Location within Montana Location within the United States
- Location: 101 Main St. Thompson Falls, Montana
- Coordinates: 47°35′40″N 115°20′41″W
- Area: less than one acre
- Built: 1911 or 1912
- Built by: C.H. Finley
- MPS: Thompson Falls MRA
- NRHP reference No.: 86002765
- Added to NRHP: October 7, 1986

The Tourist Hotel on Main St. in Thompson Falls in Sanders County, Montana was built in 1912. It was listed on the National Register of Historic Places in 1986. It has also been known as Hotel Bar.

It was first owned by William Cummings, who arrived in Thompson Falls in 1906. In 1986, it was one of only five commercial buildings surviving from Thompson Falls' early community. Its parapet with arcaded corbelling was assessed as "one of the strongest architectural decorative elements in the community."
