= Thompson Falls Dam =

Coordinates: 47°35′29″N 115°21′01″W

- Interactive map of Thompson Falls Dam
- Country: United States
- Location: Sanders County, Montana
- Status: Operational
- Opening date: 1915

Thompson Falls Dam is a dam in Sanders County, Montana, in the northwestern part of the state.

A complex of four hydropower dams stand on the Clark Fork River in downtown Thompson Falls, Montana:

- Main Channel Dam (National Inventory of Dams ID MT00224), 54 feet (16 m) high
- Dry Channel Dam (MT83013), 38 feet (12 m) high
- Intake Dam A (MT83014), 53 feet (16 m) high
- Intake Dam B (MT83015), 110 feet (34 m) high

Operations here began in 1915 with original construction on a set of natural falls. Today, the four dams together impound an upstream reservoir, with a water storage capacity of 8,300 acre-feet (10,200,000 m^{3}), and a seven-unit hydroelectric generation capacity of 94 megawatts.

Montana Power Company originally built the dam, PPL Corporation purchased it in 1997 and sold it to NorthWestern Corporation in 2014. The island between the dams contains a public park with hiking trails, picnic tables, and scenic overlooks. The site and adjacent buildings comprise the Thompson Falls Hydroelectric Dam Historic District, on the National Register of Historic Places.

== See also ==
- PPL Montana, LLC v. Montana
