= Old Agency =

Old Agency is a placename in the United States denoting the former location of an Indian agency. Old Agency may refer to:

- Agency Village, South Dakota
- Old Agency, Montana
- For the Old Agency in Mississippi, see Old Natchez Trace segments listed on the National Register of Historic Places#Old Natchez Trace and Choctaw Agency Site
