= Weeksville =

Weeksville may refer to:

- Weeksville, Brooklyn, New York, United States
- Weeksville, Montana, United States
- Weeksville, North Carolina, United States
