= Thayer House (Thompson Falls, Montana) =

Historic house in Montana, United States

- U.S. National Register of Historic Places
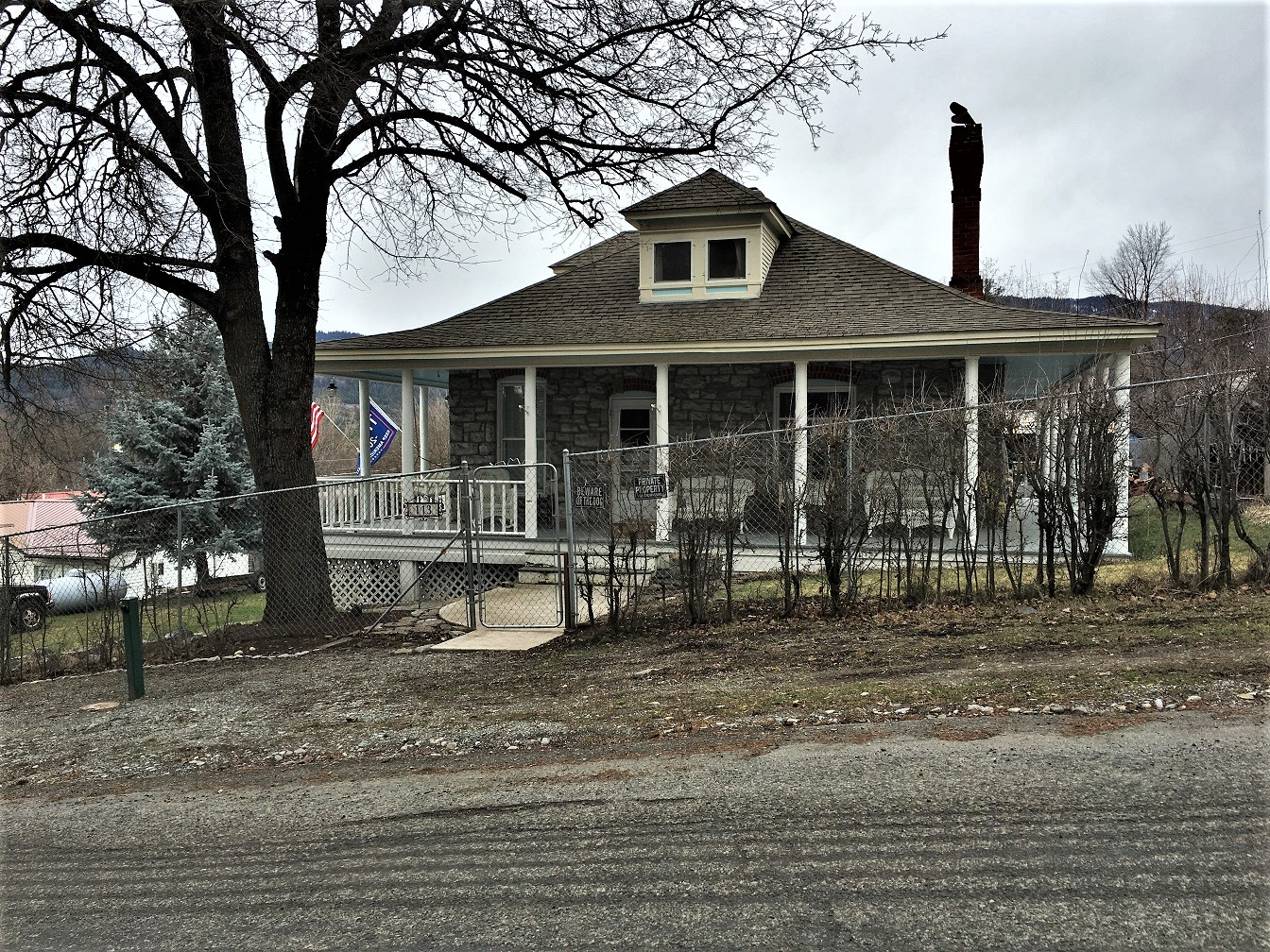

- Location within Montana Location within the United States
- Location: 109 Jefferson St. Thompson Falls, Montana
- Coordinates: 47°35′49″N 115°20′54″W
- Area: less than one acre
- Built: 1907
- Architectural style: French southern Colonial
- MPS: Thompson Falls MRA
- NRHP reference No.: 86002781
- Added to NRHP: December 22, 1986

The Thayer House at 109 Jefferson St. in Thompson Falls in Sanders County, Montana was home of Arthur W. Thayer, a mining entrepreneur and editor of the Sanders County Ledger. The stone house, built in 1907, was described as "The most portentious residence in Thompson" by the Ledger. It is "French southern Colonial" in style and was listed on the National Register of Historic Places in 1986.

It was built of stone from Thayer's quarry on the Thompson River, with the stone brought during the winter by teamster Eugene Preston by two four-horse sleighs.
