= Bull River Guard Station =

- U.S. National Register of Historic Places
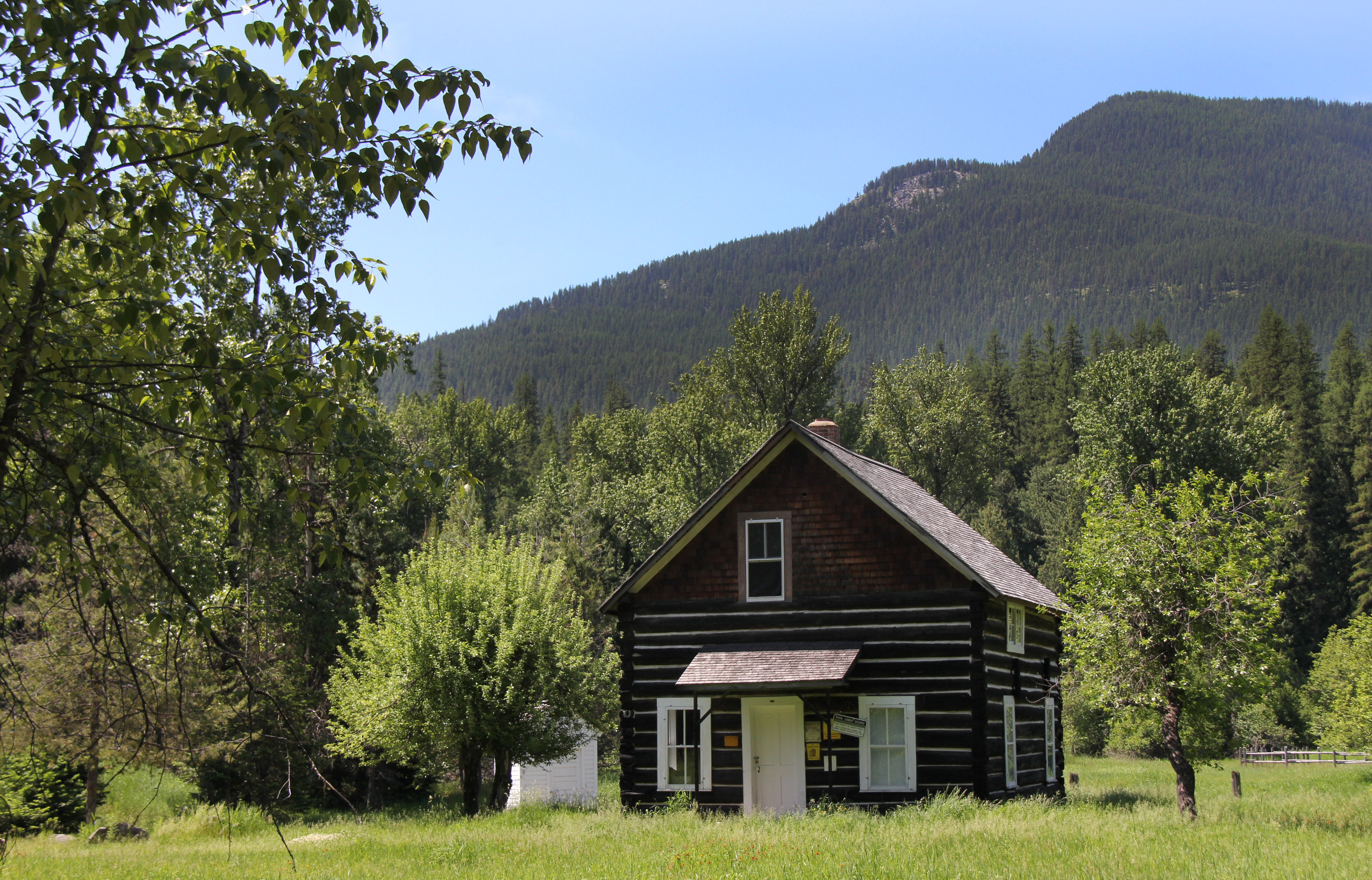
- Bull River Guard Station in 2013

- Location within Montana Location within the United States
- Nearest city: Noxon, Montana
- Coordinates: 48°06′24″N 115°46′40″W
- Area: 82.9 acres (33.5 ha)
- Built: 1908
- Built by: Gordon, Granville
- Architectural style: Rustic
- NRHP reference No.: 90000990
- Added to NRHP: June 27, 1990

The Bull River Guard Station, also known as Bull River Ranger Station, on the banks of the Bull River near its confluence with the E. Fork Bull River in the Kootenai National Forest, in Sanders County, Montana, was established in 1907. The property was listed on the National Register of Historic Places in 1990.

The office/residence at the site was built in 1908. It is a one-and-a-half-story log building on a concrete wall foundation. It was built by Granville "Granny" Gordon, said to be "a Wyoming cowboy and 'one of Teddy Roosevelt's "instant rangers"'".
