= Ward Hotel =

- U.S. National Register of Historic Places
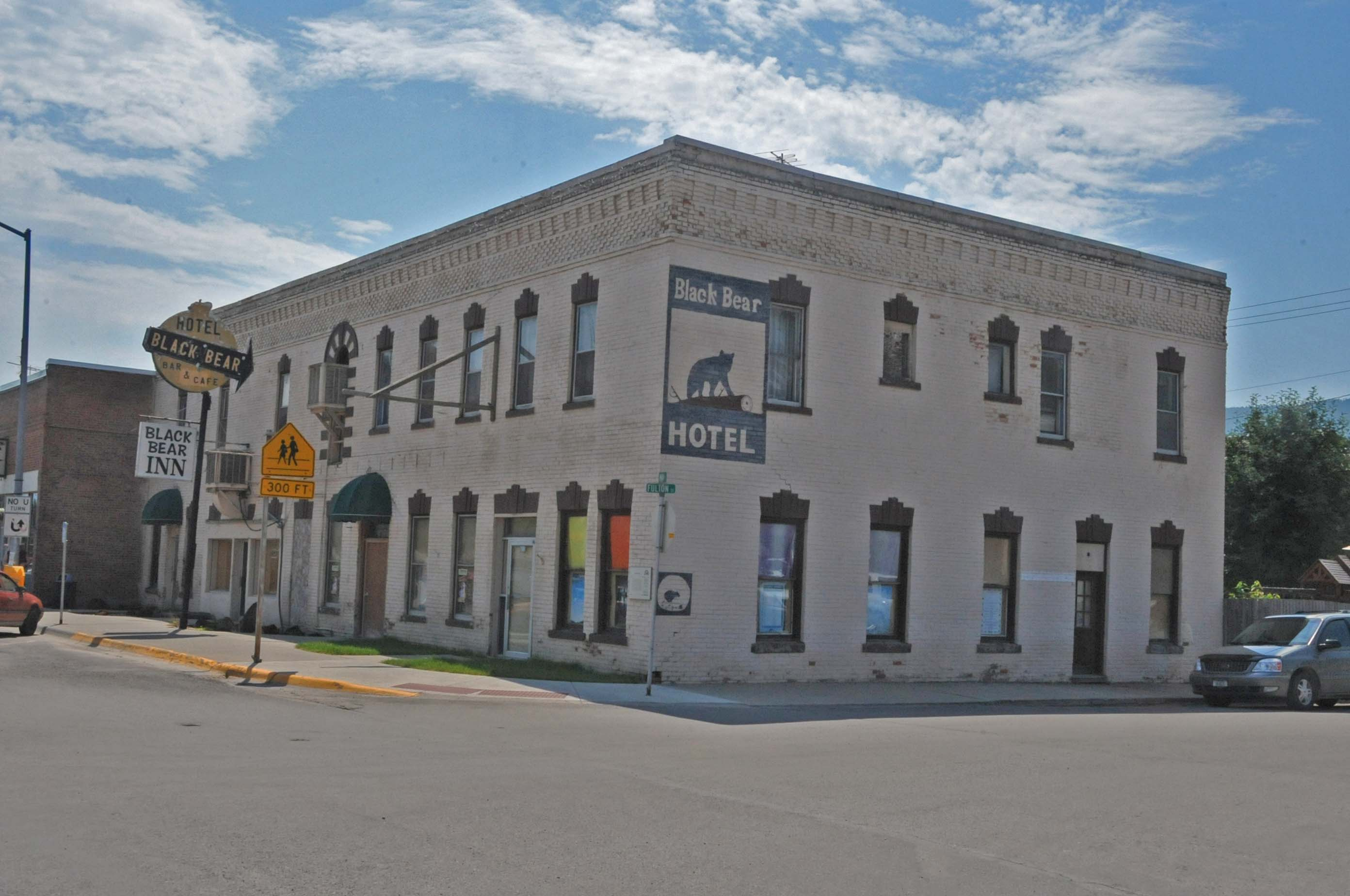

- Location within Montana Location within the United States
- Location: 925 Main St., Thompson Falls, Montana
- Coordinates: 47°35′40″N 115°20′52″W
- Area: less than one acre
- Built: 1907-1908
- Built by: Lyons, James
- MPS: Thompson Falls MRA
- NRHP reference No.: 86002769
- Added to NRHP: December 22, 1986

The Ward Hotel, at 925 Main Street in Thompson Falls in Sanders County, Montana was built in 1907–1908 by Edward Donlan. Edward Donlan is very likely the most significant individual in Thompson Falls history. He was a substantial land owner, entrepreneur and politician. He was elected state senator from Missoula in 1902, 1906, 1910 and 1918.

Construction for the Ward Hotel began in September, 1907 and was completed in May, 1908. The original design called for 30 sleeping rooms, an office, a bar, a restaurant, and a full basement for a power plant and laundry room.

The property changed hands many times. The name changed from the Ward Hotel to the Thompson in the 1920s, to the Black Bear Hotel in the 1930s, to the Townhouse Hotel in the 1970s and then back to the Black Bear.

It is a two-story post and beam building with a brick veneer laid in common bond. It is supported by a stone and mortar and wood pier foundation. It originally had a front porch which no longer exists.

The hotel is currently owned by Daniel Moore and Marlaina Mohr who have taken on the multi-year effort to restore the historic integrity of the property and once again bring it into the center of Main Street activity in Thompson Falls. It is currently named the Black Bear and is expected to be known as the Black Bear going forward.

A 1984 review assessed it as "clearly the most substantial commercial building remaining in the downtown business district in Thompson Falls."

It was listed on the National Register of Historic Places in 1986.

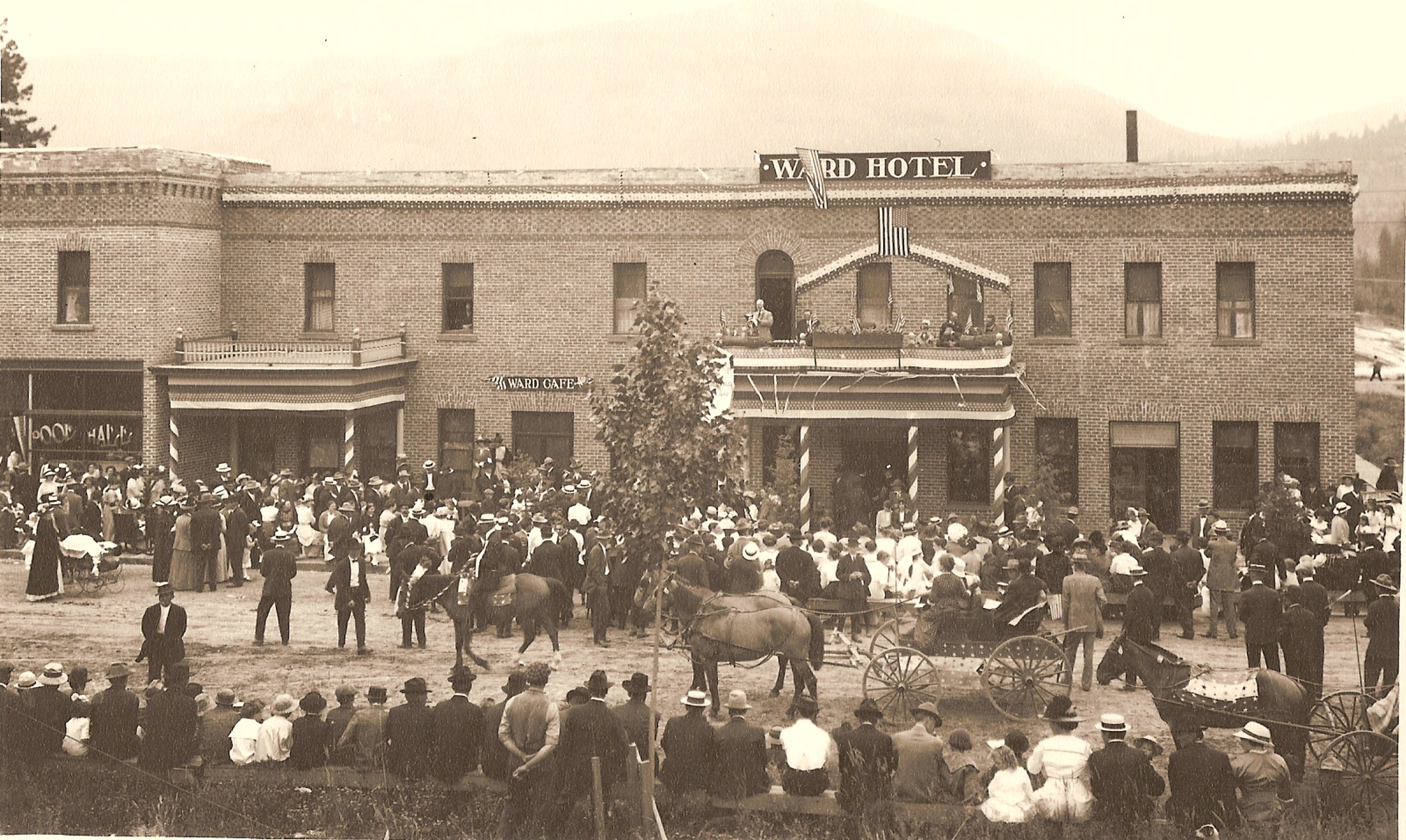
The Ward Hotel in Thompson Falls as seen in 1912-1913
