= Grandchamp House =

Historic house in Montana, United States

- U.S. National Register of Historic Places
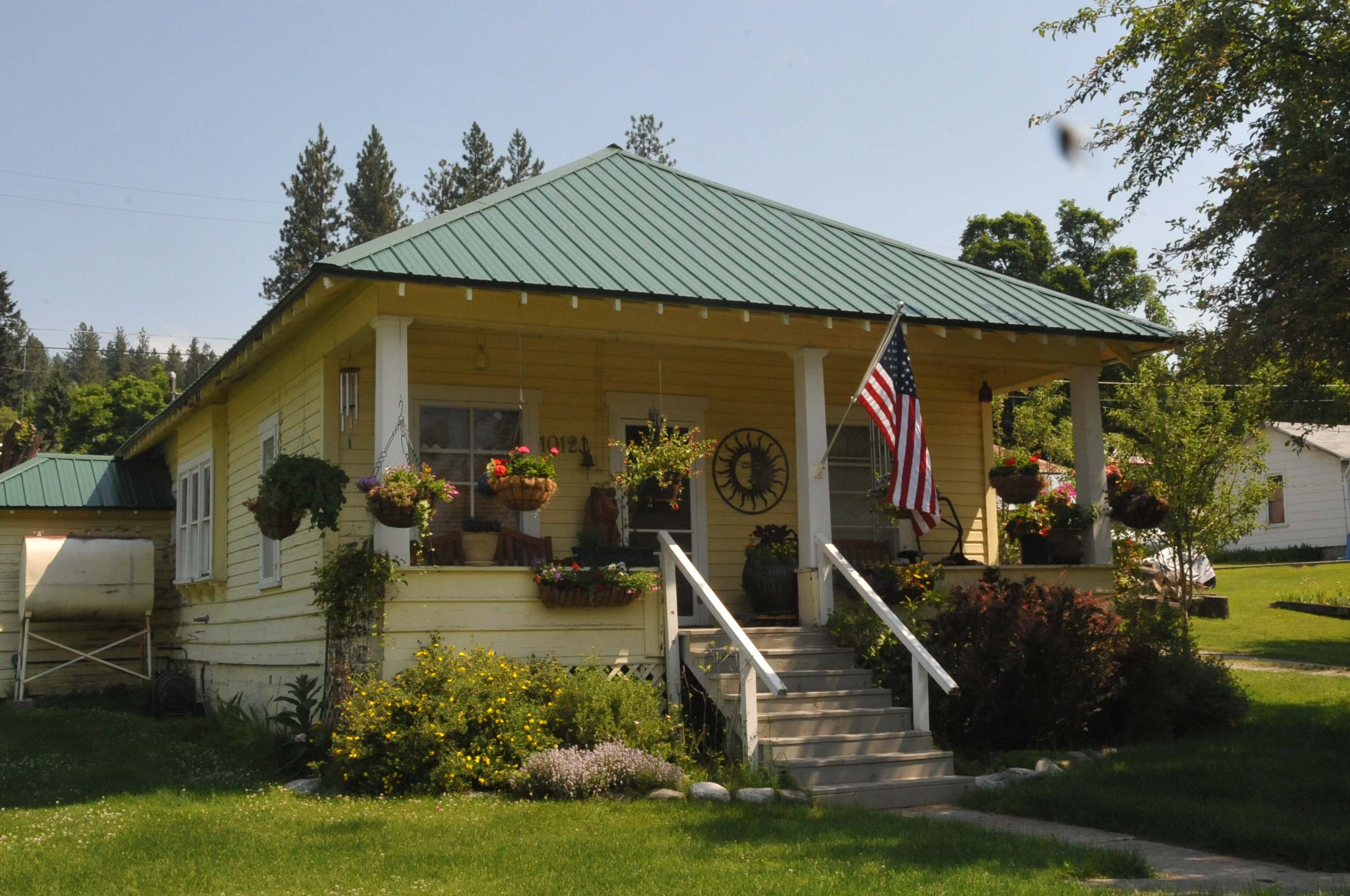

- Location within Montana Location within the United States
- Location: 1012 Preston Ave., Thompson Falls, Montana
- Coordinates: 47°35′51″N 115°21′10″W
- Area: less than one acre
- Built: 1911
- Built by: Grandchamp, Nelson
- Architectural style: Bungalow/craftsman
- MPS: Thompson Falls MRA
- NRHP reference No.: 86002776
- Added to NRHP: October 7, 1986

The Grandchamp House, at 1012 Preston Ave. in Thompson Falls in Sanders County, Montana, was built in 1911. It has also been known as Wollaston House. It was listed on the National Register of Historic Places in 1986.

It was deemed significant as "an intact example of a Bungalow style residence." It was built by carpenter Nelson Grandchamp, who built three bungalows in Thompson Falls during 1910–12.
