= Weber's Store =

- U.S. National Register of Historic Places
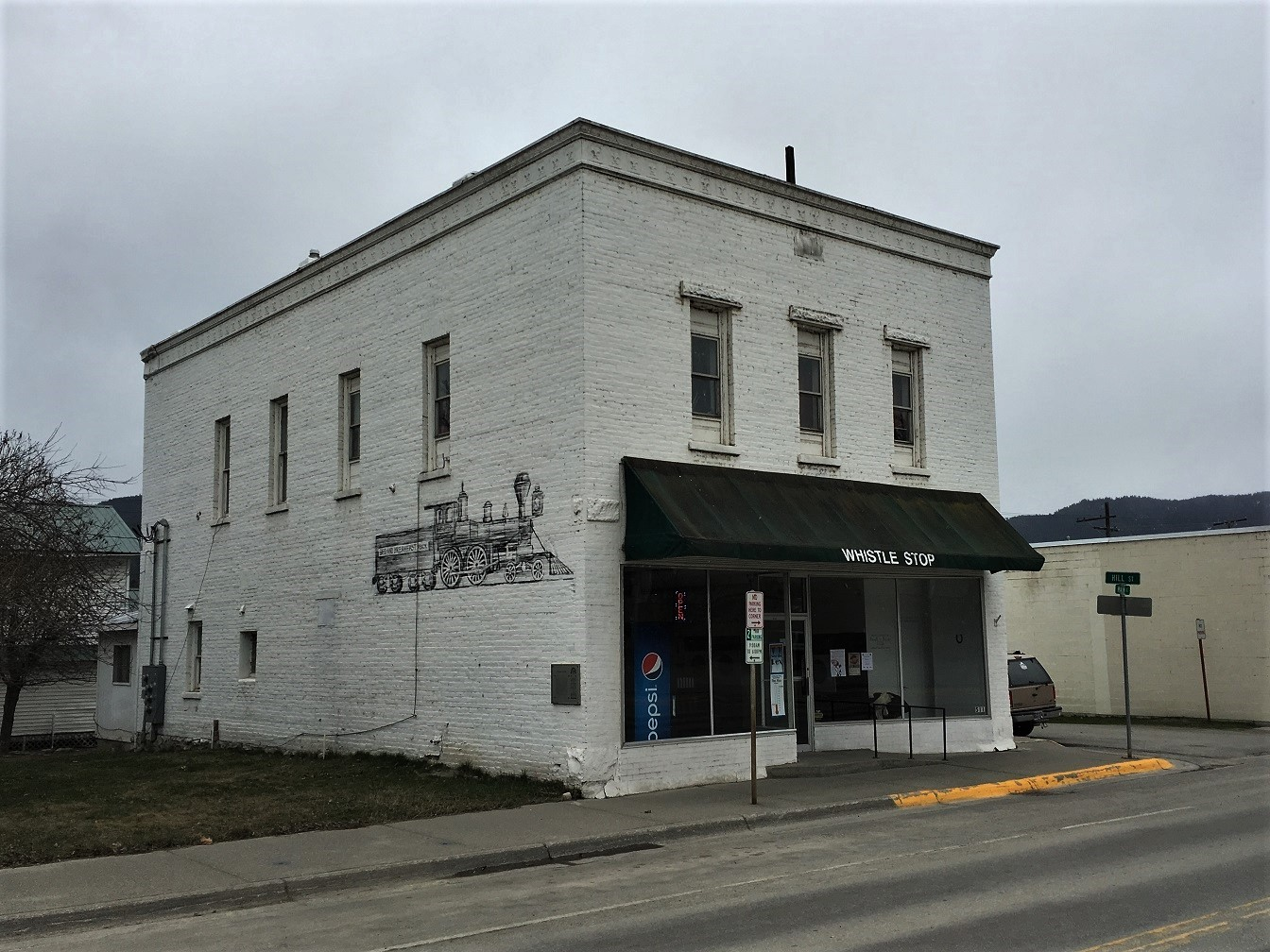

- Location within Montana Location within the United States
- Location: 510 Main St. Thompson Falls, Montana
- Coordinates: 47°35′37″N 115°20′34″W
- Area: less than one acre
- MPS: Thompson Falls MRA
- NRHP reference No.: 86002763
- Added to NRHP: October 7, 1986

Weber's Store, at 510 Main St. in Thompson Falls in Sanders County, Montana was listed on the National Register of Historic Places in 1986. It has also been known as Thompson Falls Laundry.

It is a two-story brick building on a stone and mortar foundation. It was a general store and a post office, with an apartment above. Charles Weber, who came to Thompson Falls as a laborer before 1890, was postmaster from 1903 to 1917.

A cold storage building behind the store is a second contributing building in the listing.
