= KTHM =

KTHM may refer to:

- Thompson Falls Airport (ICAO code KTHM)
- KTHM (FM), a radio station (94.1 FM) licensed to serve Waynoka, Oklahoma, United States
- KFOI, a radio station (90.9 FM) licensed to serve Red Bluff, California, United States, which held the call sign KTHM from 2006 to 2017
