= Mount Heron, Virginia =

Unincorporated community in Virginia, United States

Coordinates: 37°11′16″N 82°00′16″W

Mount Heron is an unincorporated community in Buchanan County, Virginia, United States.

== History ==
A post office was established as Mount Heron in 1925, and remained in operation until it was discontinued in 1965. According to one source, the community may be named after Heron, Montana.
