= Ainsworth House (Thompson Falls, Montana) =

Historic house in Montana, United States

- U.S. National Register of Historic Places
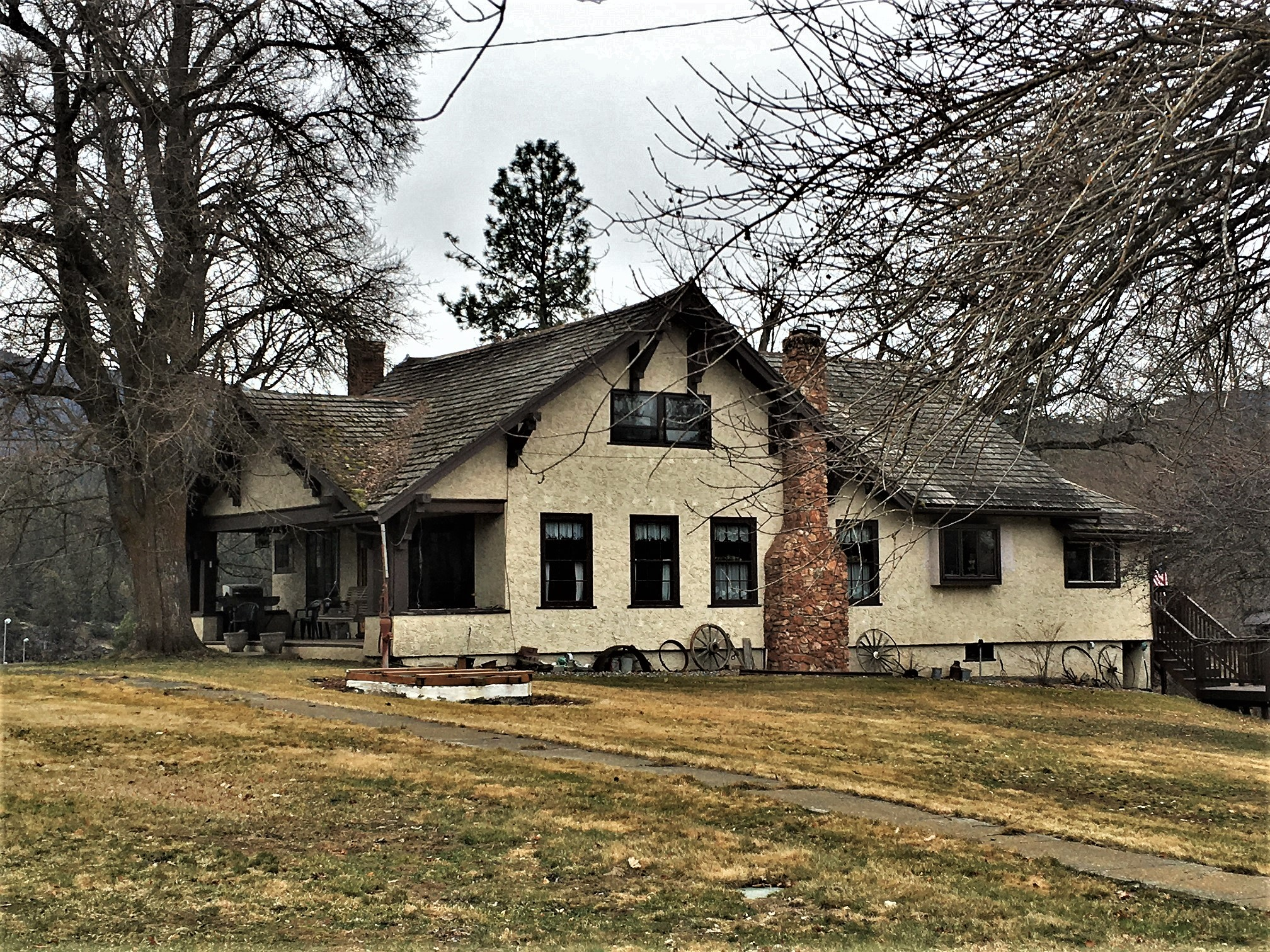

- Location within Montana Location within the United States
- Location: 911 Maiden Ln. Thompson Falls, Montana
- Coordinates: 47°35′43″N 115°21′19″W
- Area: less than one acre
- Built: 1910
- Architectural style: Bungalow/craftsman
- MPS: Thompson Falls MRA
- NRHP reference No.: 86002771
- Added to NRHP: October 7, 1986

The Ainsworth House in Thompson Falls in Sanders County, Montana was built in 1910. It was listed on the National Register of Historic Places in 1986. It has also been known as Fisher House.

It is a one-and-a-half-story "bungalow-inspired" house. It was built for Auburn S. Ainsworth, an attorney and realtor. Mrs. Ainsworth "is best remembered as an eccentric lady who sponsored Christian Scientist meetings in her home for many years."
