= Northern Pacific Warehouse =

- U.S. National Register of Historic Places
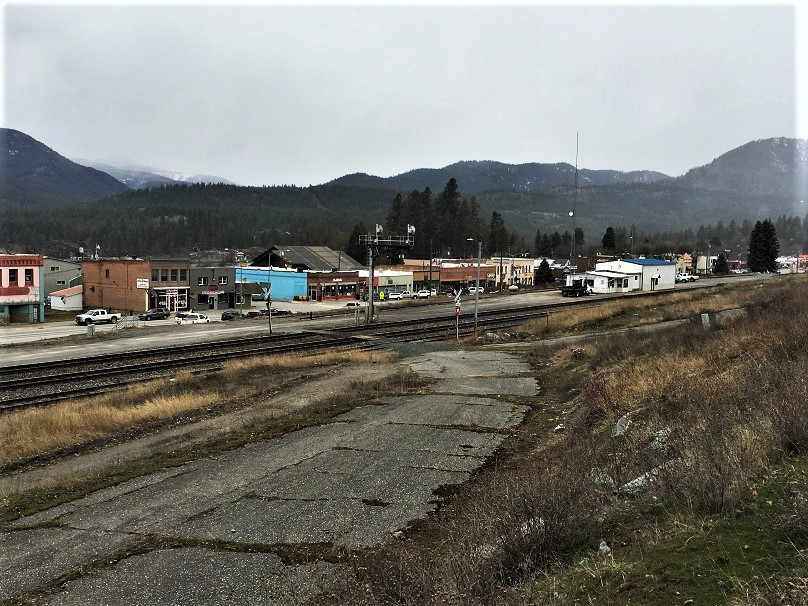
- Site of the warehouse

- Location within Montana Location within the United States
- Location: Bounded by Preston Ave. and Main St. along the Burlington Northern, Thompson Falls, Montana
- Coordinates: 47°35′40″N 115°20′38″W
- Area: less than one acre
- Built: 1900
- MPS: Thompson Falls MRA
- NRHP reference No.: 86002785
- Added to NRHP: October 7, 1986

The Northern Pacific Warehouse in Thompson Falls, Montana, also known as the Burlington Northern Warehouse, was built in 1900 and was listed on the National Register of Historic Places in 1986.

The listed property is bounded by Preston Ave. and Main St. along the Burlington Northern right-of-way.

It was deemed significant as the sole surviving structure from the railroad industry in Thompson Falls.
