= Griffen House =

Historic house in Montana, United States

- U.S. National Register of Historic Places
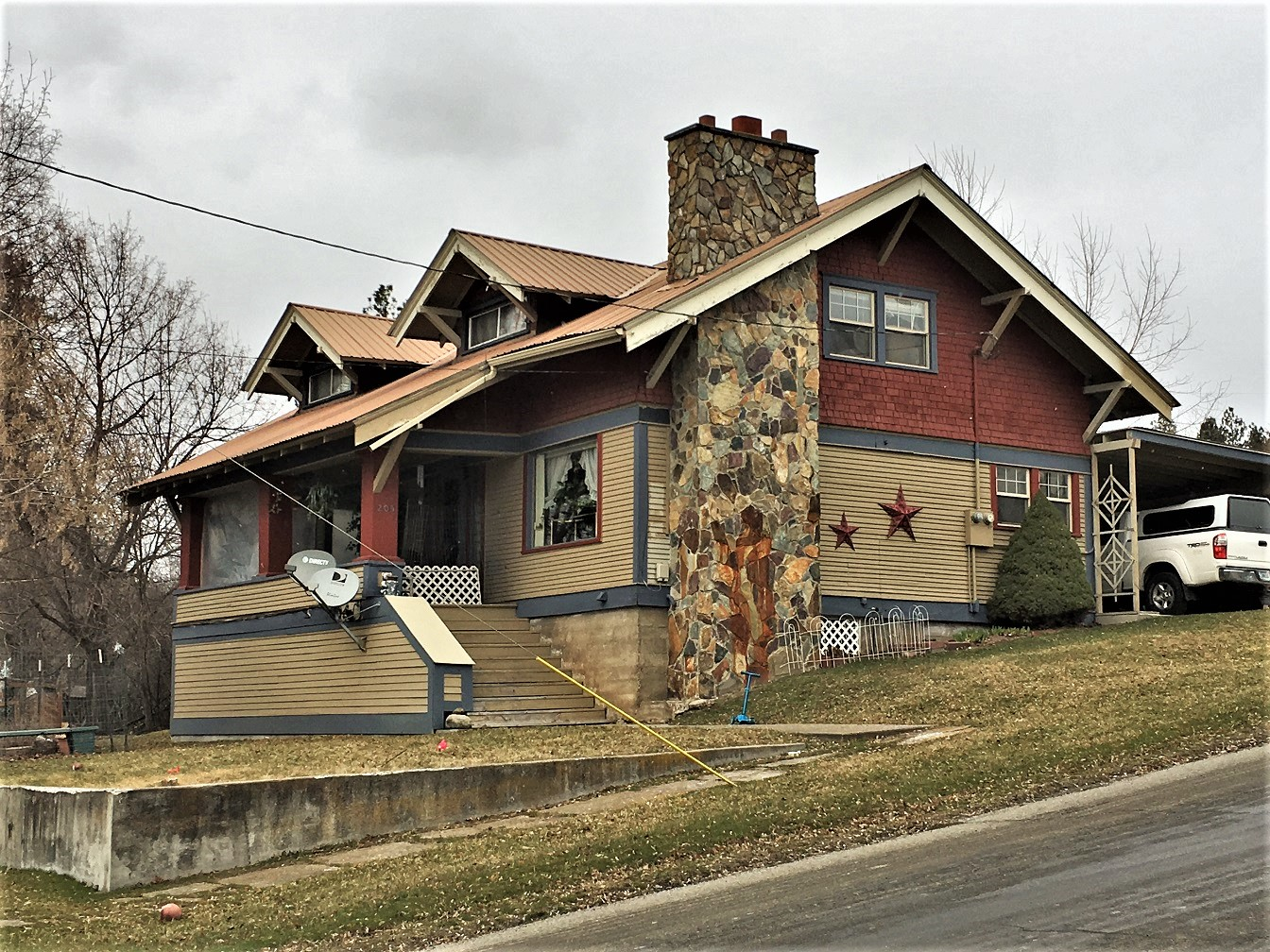

- Location within Montana Location within the United States
- Location: 205 Gallatin St. Thompson Falls, Montana
- Coordinates: 47°35′53″N 115°21′4″W
- Area: less than one acre
- Built: 1912
- Built by: McCurdy, Walter S.
- Architectural style: Bungalow/craftsman
- MPS: Thompson Falls MRA
- NRHP reference No.: 86002779
- Added to NRHP: October 7, 1986

Griffen House, at 205 Gallatin St. in Thompson Falls, Montana, was built in 1912. It was listed on the National Register of Historic Places in 1986. It has also been known as Kendall House.

It is a bungalow which originally was 28 by 40 feet (8.5 m × 12.2 m) in plan. It has a gable roof.

It was home for Claude W. Criffen, who came in 1911 to lead the U.S. Forest Service operations in Thompson Falls. He served as Supervisor of the Cabinet National Forest until 1917. It was later home of Orin Kendall (d.1982), who served as County Superintendent of Schools from 1946 to 1968, then served in the state legislature. He also served as mayor of Thompson Falls and on the town council.
