= House at 112 Park Street =

Historic house in Montana, United States

- U.S. National Register of Historic Places
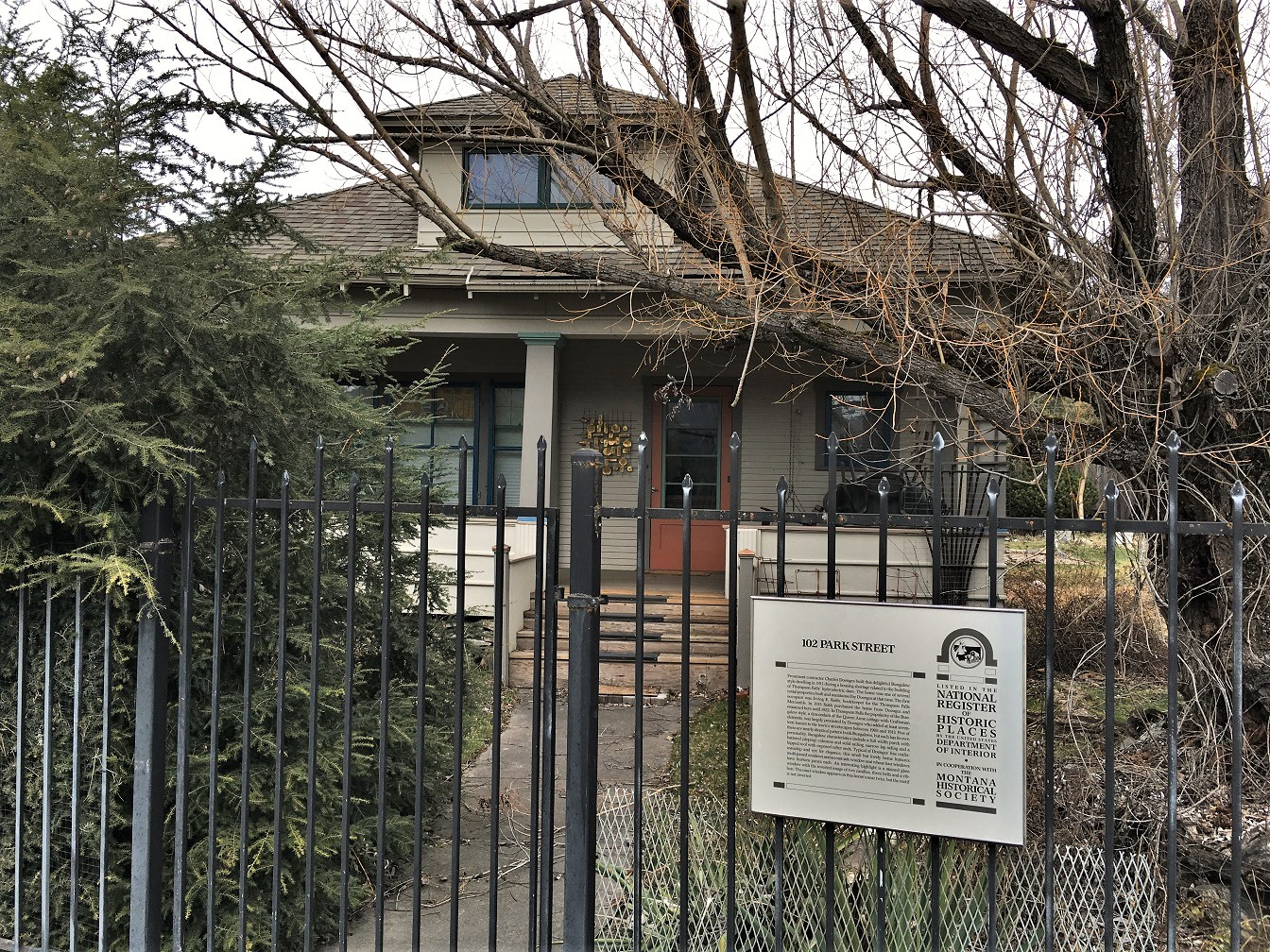

- Location within Montana Location within the United States
- Location: 112 Park St., Thompson Falls, Montana
- Coordinates: 47°35′51″N 115°21′7″W
- Area: less than one acre
- Built: 1911-12
- Built by: Doenges, C.H.
- MPS: Thompson Falls MRA
- NRHP reference No.: 86002778
- Added to NRHP: October 7, 1986

The House at 112 Park Street, also known as the Browne Residence, in Thompson Falls, Montana was built in 1911–12. It was listed on the National Register of Historic Places in 1986.

It was a one-story frame house with several elements of Bungalow, including its front porch under its hipped roof, supported by battered columns. In 1984 its roof was covered by asbestos shingles. It was built by contractor Charles H. Doenges, with design likely from a pattern book, for his brother Louis Doenges.
