= Camas, Montana =

- CDP
- Location within Montana
- Coordinates: 47°37′5″N 114°39′22″W
- Country: United States
- State: Montana
- County: Sanders

Area
  - Total: 0.55 sq mi (1.42 km^{2})
  - Land: 0.55 sq mi (1.42 km^{2})
  - Water: 0 sq mi (0.00 km^{2})
- Elevation: 2,828 ft (862 m)

Population (2020)
  - Total: 57
  - Density: 104.1/sq mi (40.21/km^{2})
- Time zone: UTC-7 (Mountain (MST))
  - Summer (DST): UTC-6 (MDT)
- Area code: 406
- FIPS code: 30-11800
- GNIS feature ID: 2583795

Camas is a census-designated place (CDP) in Sanders County, Montana, United States. As of the 2020 census, Camas had a population of 57.

== Demographics ==
Historical population
Census	Pop.	Note	%±
2020	57		—
U.S. Decennial Census

== See also ==
- Camas Hot Springs
