= House at 916 Preston Avenue =

United States historic place

- U.S. National Register of Historic Places

- Location within Montana Location within the United States
- Location: 916 Preston Ave., Thompson Falls, Montana
- Coordinates: 47°35′49″N 115°21′7″W
- Area: less than one acre
- Built: 1911-12
- Built by: Doenges, C.H.
- Architectural style: Bungalow/craftsman
- MPS: Thompson Falls MRA
- NRHP reference No.: 86002777
- Added to NRHP: October 7, 1986

The House at 916 Preston Avenue in Thompson Falls, Montana was built in 1911–12. It was listed on the National Register of Historic Places in 1986.

It was a one-story Bungalow/craftsman-style house. It was built by contractor Charles H. Doenges, who built at least 17 houses in Thompson Falls.

Its first occupant was probably Irving E. Keith, bookkeeper for the Thompson Falls Mercantile Company. Keith sold the house in 1922 to E. L. Stackpole, the County Treasurer.
