= Thompson Falls Airport =

- IATA: THM; ICAO: KTHM; FAA LID: THM

Summary
- Airport type: Public
- Owner: Sanders County
- Serves: Thompson Falls, Montana
- Elevation AMSL: 2,467 ft / 752 m
- Coordinates: 47°34′25″N 115°16′50″W
- Interactive map of Thompson Falls Airport

Runways
| Direction | Length | | Surface |
| Direction | ft | m | Surface |
|---|---|---|---|
| 7/25 | 4,200 | 1,280 | Asphalt |

Statistics (2008)
- Aircraft operations: 7,000
- Based aircraft: 12
- Source: Federal Aviation Administration

Thompson Falls Airport (IATA: THM, ICAO: KTHM, FAA LID: THM) is a county-owned, public-use airport located three nautical miles (6 km) southeast of the central business district of Thompson Falls, a city in Sanders County, Montana, United States. It is included in the National Plan of Integrated Airport Systems for 2011–2015, which categorized it as a general aviation airport.

== Facilities and aircraft ==
Thompson Falls Airport covers an area of 136 acres (55 ha) at an elevation of 2,467 feet (752 m) above mean sea level. It has one runway designated 7/25 with an asphalt surface measuring 4,200 by 75 feet (1,280 x 23 m).

For the 12-month period ending July 22, 2008, the airport had 7,000 general aviation aircraft operations, an average of 19 per day. At that time there were 12 aircraft based at this airport, all single-engine.

== See also ==
- List of airports in Montana
