= Sanders County Jail =

- U.S. National Register of Historic Places
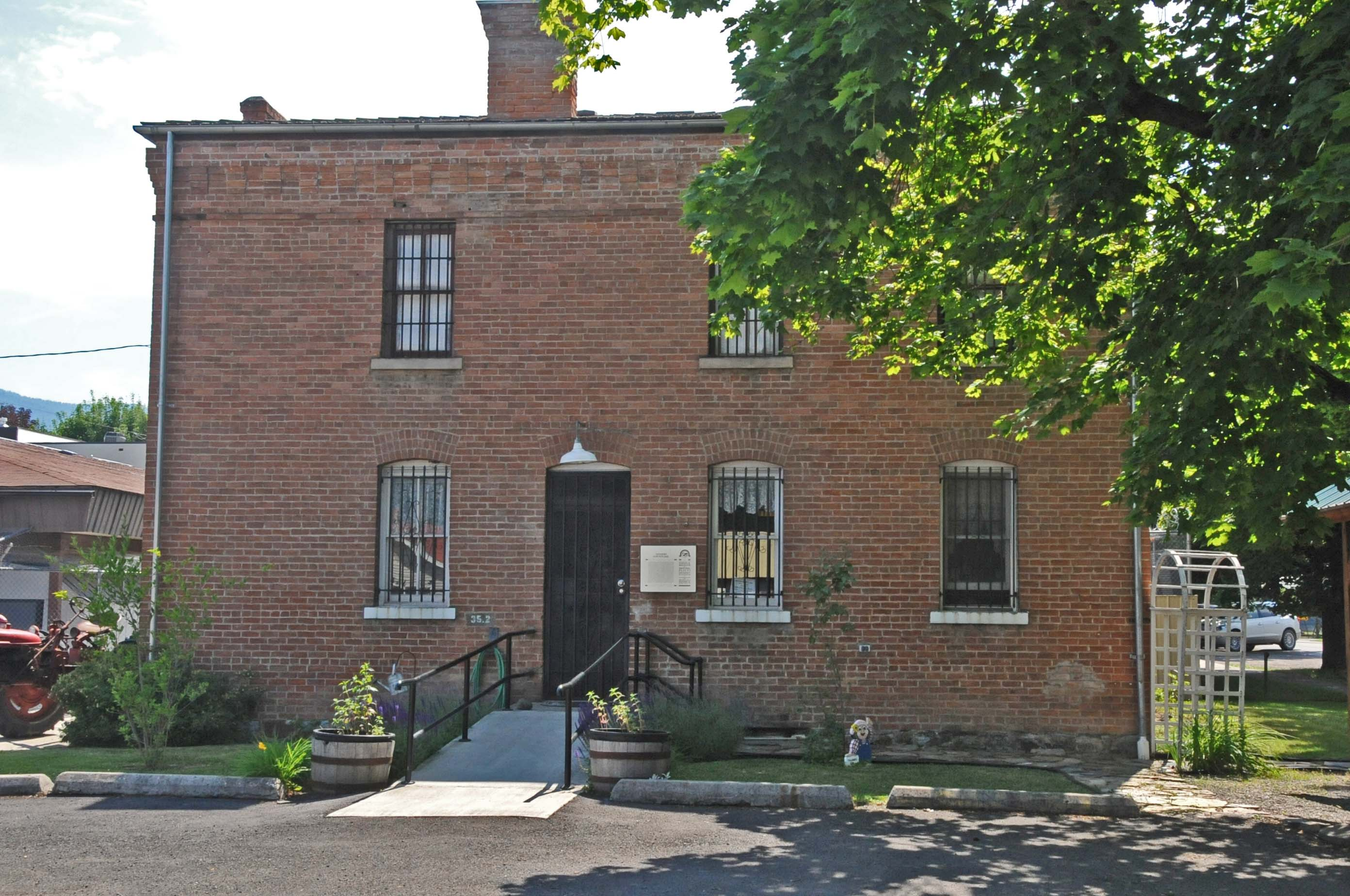

- Location within Montana Location within the United States
- Location: Madison and Maiden Lane, Thompson Falls, Montana
- Coordinates: 47°35′42″N 115°21′0″W
- Area: less than one acre
- Built: 1907
- Built by: Christian & Gobelet
- MPS: Thompson Falls MRA
- NRHP reference No.: 86002774
- Added to NRHP: October 7, 1986

The Sanders County Jail is a historic jail built in 1907 in Thompson Falls in Sanders County, Montana. It was listed on the National Register of Historic Places in 1986.

It was built by contractors Christian & Gobelet for $5,000 and is a two-story brick building on a stone and mortar foundation. It has a shallow hipped roof. It has jail cells installed by the Paully Jail Company of St. Louis.

In 1984 it was the oldest surviving county building, and it was rented out to the Thompson Falls Historical Society.
