= Belknap, Montana =

- CDP
- Location within Montana
- Coordinates: 47°38′50″N 115°25′20″W
- Country: United States
- State: Montana
- County: Sanders
- Founded: 1883

Area
  - Total: 4.76 sq mi (12.33 km^{2})
  - Land: 4.76 sq mi (12.33 km^{2})
  - Water: 0 sq mi (0.00 km^{2})
- Elevation: 3,593 ft (1,095 m)

Population (2020)
  - Total: 161
  - Density: 33.8/sq mi (13.06/km^{2})
- Time zone: UTC-7 (Mountain (MST))
  - Summer (DST): UTC-6 (MDT)
- Area code: 406
- FIPS code: 30-05050
- GNIS feature ID: 2583789

Belknap is a census-designated place (CDP) in Sanders County, Montana United States. As of the 2020 census, Belknap had a population of 161.

Belknap was a part of Missoula County until 1906, when it became a part of Sanders County.

== Demographics ==
Historical population
Census	Pop.	Note	%±
2020	161		—
U.S. Decennial Census
