= Gem Saloon =

- U.S. National Register of Historic Places
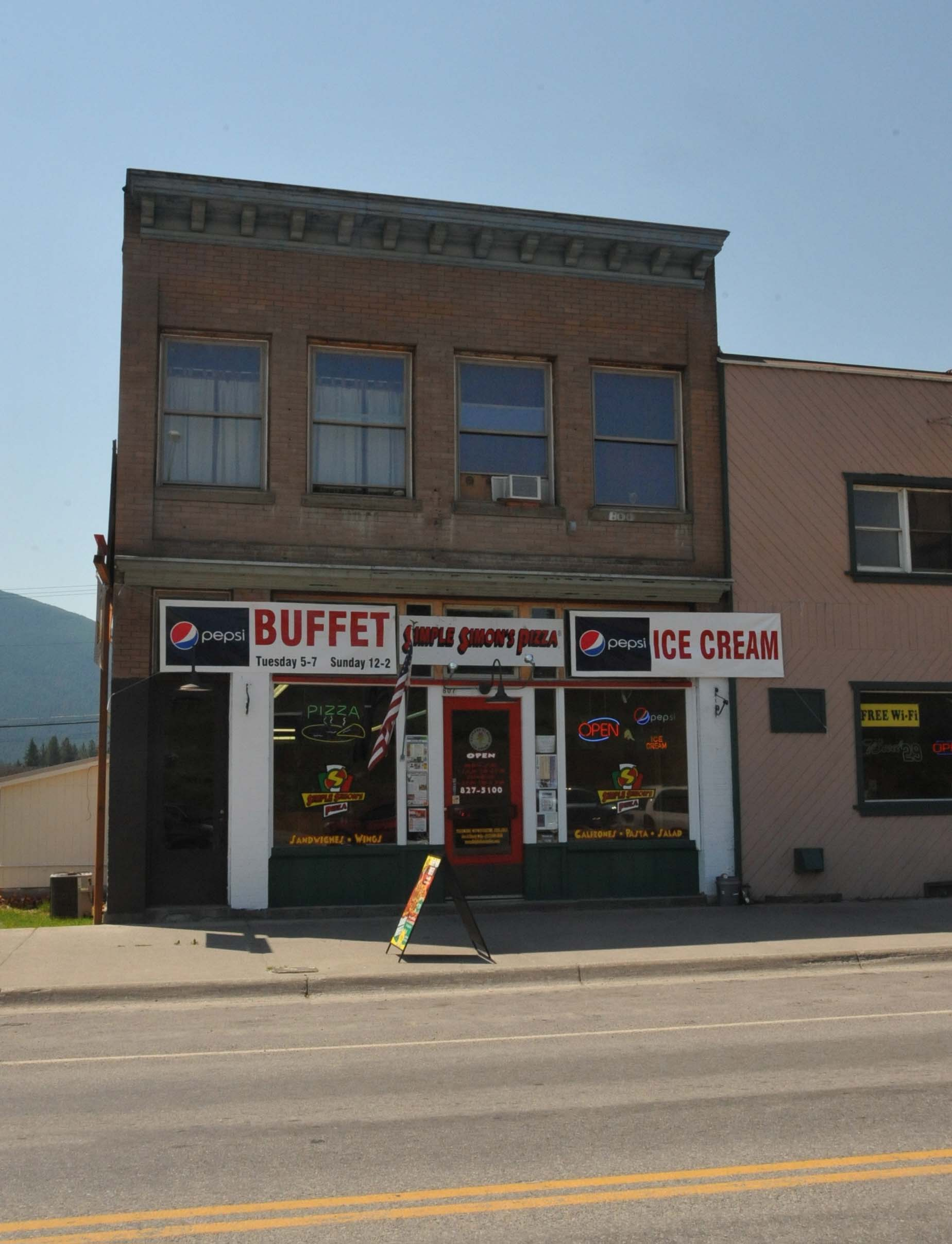
- Photo in 2013

- Location within Montana Location within the United States
- Location: 808 Main St., Thompson Falls, Montana
- Coordinates: 47°35′40″N 115°20′45″W
- Area: less than one acre
- Built: 1914
- MPS: Thompson Falls MRA
- NRHP reference No.: 86002767
- Added to NRHP: October 7, 1986

The Gem Saloon, at 808 Main St. in Thompson Falls, Montana, USA, was built in 1914. It is a historic building listed on the U.S. National Register of Historic Places. It has also been used by, and was known as, Napa Auto Parts, and has been a restaurant, too. When photographed in 2013 it held a pizza shop.

It was listed on the National Register of Historic Places in 1986.

It was one of five commercial buildings in Thompson Falls that were together listed on the NRHP, as part of a multiple property submission.
