= Hoyt House (Thompson Falls, Montana) =

Historic house in Montana, United States

- U.S. National Register of Historic Places
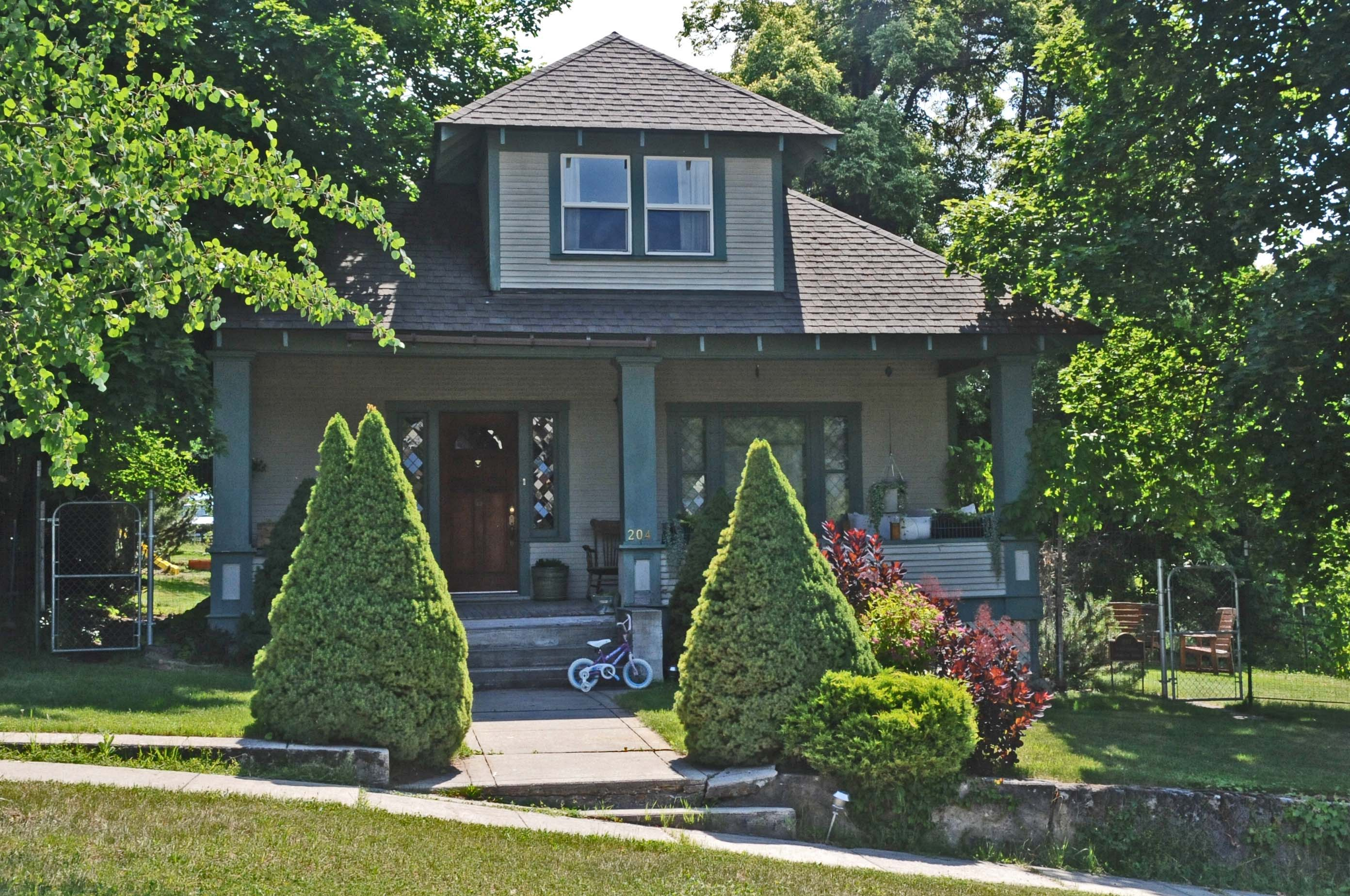

- Location within Montana Location within the United States
- Location: 204 Gallatin St., Thompson Falls, Montana
- Coordinates: 47°35′52″N 115°20′59″W
- Area: less than one acre
- Built: 1914
- Architectural style: Bungalow/craftsman
- MPS: Thompson Falls MRA
- NRHP reference No.: 86002780
- Added to NRHP: October 7, 1986

The Hoyt House, in 204 Gallatin St. in Thompson Falls in Sanders County, Montana, was built in 1914. It was listed on the National Register of Historic Places in 1986.

It is a one-and-a-half-story bungalow with narrow lap siding. It has a full-width front porch, supported by four square columns, under its hipped roof.

It was originally owned by Randolph R. Hoyt, who came to Thompson Falls in 1907 and became co-owner of the Thompson Hotel in 1909
