= Bedard House =

Historic house in Montana, United States

- U.S. National Register of Historic Places
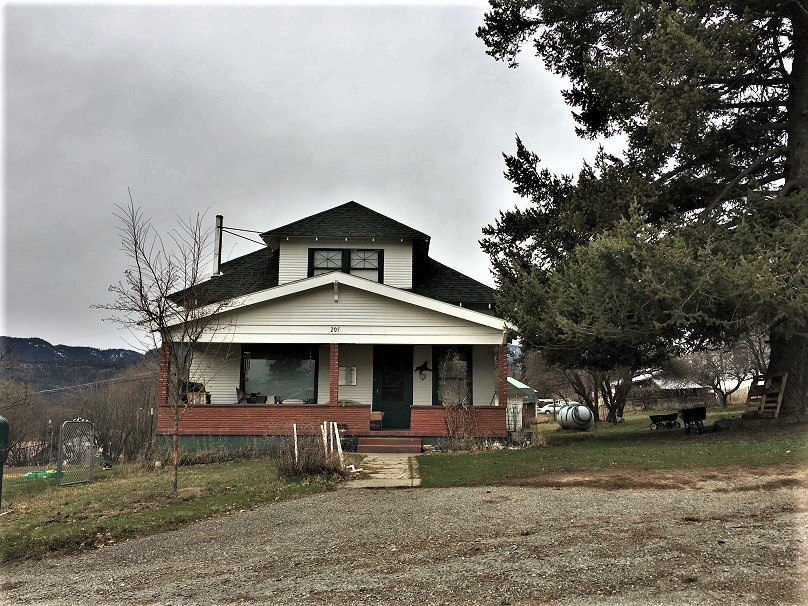

- Location within Montana Location within the United States
- Location: 207 Spruce St. Thompson Falls, Montana
- Coordinates: 47°35′50″N 115°20′43″W
- Area: less than one acre
- Built: 1912
- Built by: Wicksell, Charles; Brown, Ecton
- Architectural style: Bungalow/craftsman
- MPS: Thompson Falls MRA
- NRHP reference No.: 86002783
- Added to NRHP: October 7, 1986

The Bedard House, at 207 Spruce St. in Thompson Falls, Montana, was built in 1912. It was listed on the National Register of Historic Places in 1986. It has also been known as Roys Residence.

It was built by Charles Wicksell and Ecton Brown. It is "a good example of a large 'pattern book' Bungalow style house which flourished throughout the United States during the first two decades of the 20th century, and was commonly built on the west side of Thompson Falls in ca.1910."
