= Thompson Falls Hydroelectric Dam Historic District =

Historic district in Montana, United States

- U.S. National Register of Historic Places
- U.S. Historic district
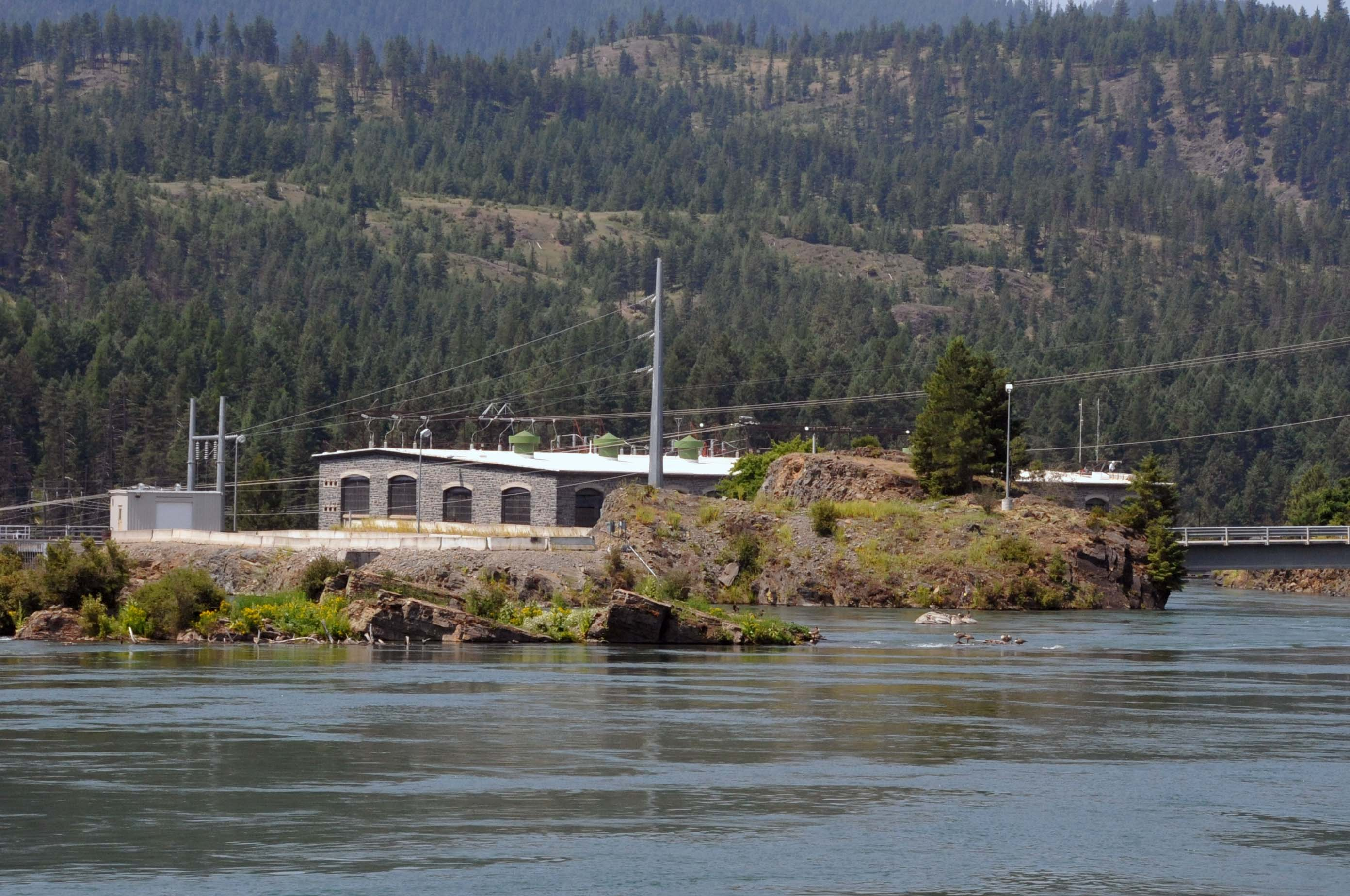

- Location within Montana Location within the United States
- Location: US ALT 10 at Clark Fork River within NW part of Thompson Falls, Thompson Falls, Montana
- Area: 80 acres (32 ha)
- Built: 1912
- Built by: Peppard, O.E.; Cowles, William
- MPS: Thompson Falls MRA
- NRHP reference No.: 86002756 (original); 100007902 (increase)

Significant dates
- Added to NRHP: October 7, 1986
- Boundary increase: July 6, 2022

Thompson Falls Hydroelectric Dam Historic District is an 80 acres (32 ha) historic district in Thompson Falls which includes six contributing buildings. It is located on the Clark Fork River, on alternate U.S. Route 10, within the northwestern part of Thompson Falls at the Thompson Falls Dam.

It includes the St. Lukes Hospital, a two-story frame building built in 1910, which was the first community hospital in Thompson Falls.
