= Preston Hall =

Preston Hall may refer to:

- Preston Hall, Aylesford, Kent
- Preston Hall, Midlothian
- Preston Hall, Preston-on-Tees
- Preston Hall (Waitsburg, Washington)

== See also ==
- Preston House (disambiguation)
