= Weeksville, Montana =

- CDP
- Location within Montana
- Coordinates: 47°31′52″N 115°0′28″W
- Country: United States
- State: Montana
- County: Sanders
- Established: 1882

Area
  - Total: 2.91 sq mi (7.54 km^{2})
  - Land: 2.91 sq mi (7.54 km^{2})
  - Water: 0 sq mi (0.00 km^{2})
- Elevation: 2,792 ft (851 m)

Population (2020)
  - Total: 81
  - Density: 27.8/sq mi (10.75/km^{2})
- Time zone: UTC-7 (Mountain (MST))
  - Summer (DST): UTC-6 (MDT)
- Area code: 406
- FIPS code: 30-78775
- GNIS feature ID: 2583862

Weeksville is a census-designated place (CDP) in Sanders County, Montana, United States. As of the 2020 census, Weeksville had a population of 81.

Weeksville was part of Missoula County until 1906, when it became part of Sanders County.

== Demographics ==
Historical population
Census	Pop.	Note	%±
2020	81		—
U.S. Decennial Census
