= Old Agency, Montana =

- CDP
- Location of Old Agency, Montana
- Coordinates: 47°19′24″N 114°17′52″W
- Country: United States
- State: Montana
- County: Sanders

Area
  - Total: 0.66 sq mi (1.70 km^{2})
  - Land: 0.56 sq mi (1.46 km^{2})
  - Water: 0.093 sq mi (0.24 km^{2})
- Elevation: 2,549 ft (777 m)

Population (2020)
  - Total: 81
  - Density: 143/sq mi (55.3/km^{2})
- Time zone: UTC-7 (Mountain (MST))
  - Summer (DST): UTC-6 (MDT)
- Area code: 406
- FIPS code: 30-55260
- GNIS feature ID: 1853185

Old Agency is a census-designated place (CDP) in Sanders County, Montana, United States. As of the 2020 census, Old Agency had a population of 81.

== Geography ==
Old Agency is located at 47°19′24″N 114°17′52″W (47.323309, -114.297795).

According to the United States Census Bureau, the CDP has a total area of 0.7 square miles (1.8 km^{2}), of which 0.6 square miles (1.6 km^{2}) is land and 0.1 square miles (0.26 km^{2}) (14.71%) is water.

== Demographics ==
Historical population
Census	Pop.	Note	%±
2020	81		—
U.S. Decennial Census

As of the census of 2000, there were 95 people, 31 households, and 23 families residing in the CDP. The population density was 161.8 inhabitants per square mile (62.5/km^{2}). There were 39 housing units at an average density of 66.4 per square mile (25.6/km^{2}). The racial makeup of the CDP was 15.79% White, 78.95% Native American, and 5.26% from two or more races. Hispanic or Latino of any race were 1.05% of the population.

There were 31 households, out of which 51.6% had children under the age of 18 living with them, 35.5% were married couples living together, 19.4% had a female householder with no husband present, and 25.8% were non-families. 19.4% of all households were made up of individuals, and 3.2% had someone living alone who was 65 years of age or older. The average household size was 3.06 and the average family size was 3.57.

In the CDP, the population was spread out, with 36.8% under the age of 18, 13.7% from 18 to 24, 32.6% from 25 to 44, 9.5% from 45 to 64, and 7.4% who were 65 years of age or older. The median age was 24 years. For every 100 females, there were 102.1 males. For every 100 females age 18 and over, there were 106.9 males.

The median income for a household in the CDP was $18,750, and the median income for a family was $22,917. Males had a median income of $22,250 versus $11,250 for females. The per capita income for the CDP was $7,623. There were 48.4% of families and 53.2% of the population living below the poverty line, including 55.6% of under eighteens and 50.0% of those over 64.
