= Preston House (Thompson Falls, Montana) =

Historic house in Montana, United States

- U.S. National Register of Historic Places
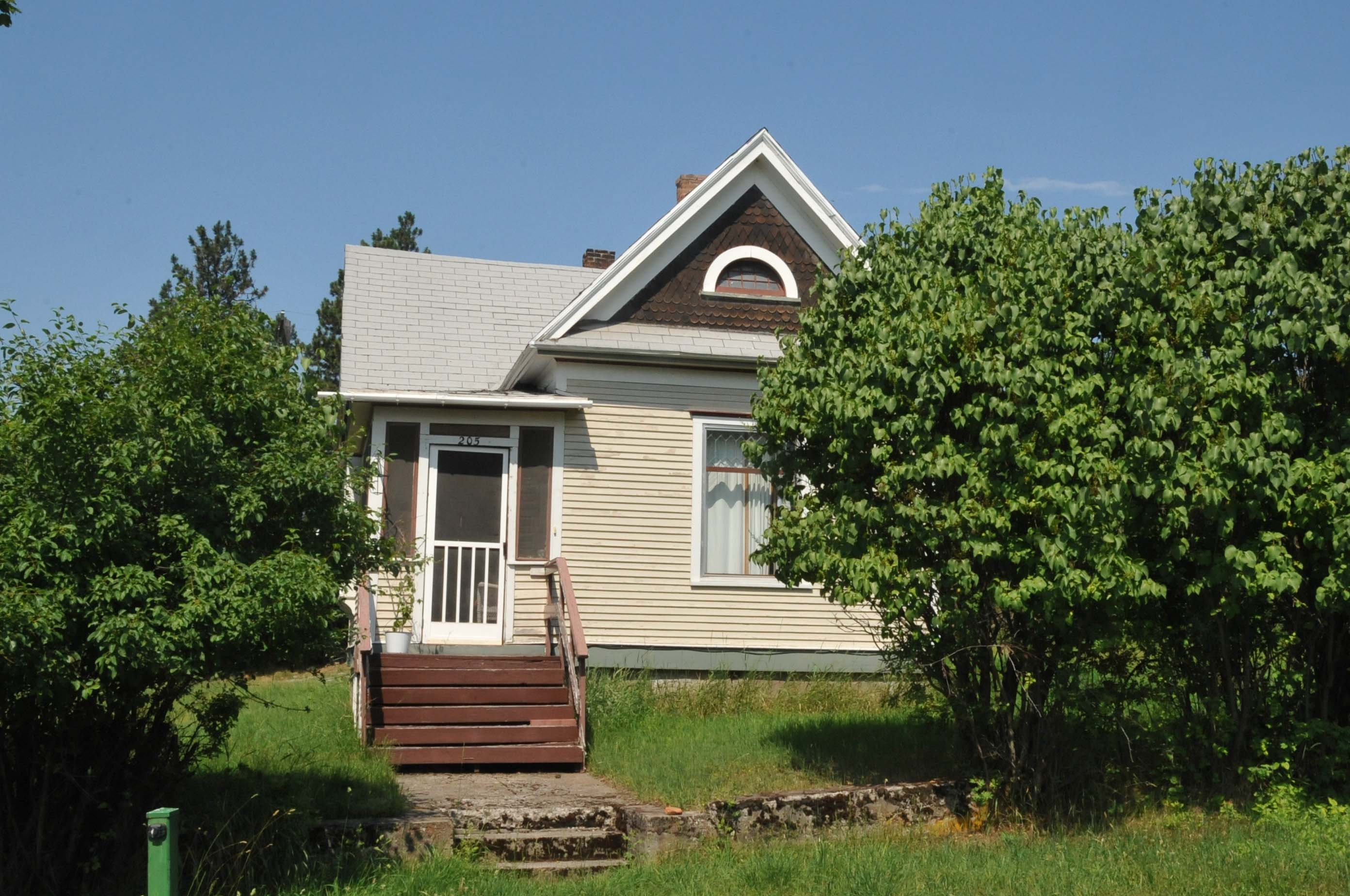

- Location within Montana Location within the United States
- Location: 205 Ferry St., Thompson Falls, Montana
- Coordinates: 47°35′45″N 115°20′30″W
- Area: less than one acre
- Built: 1909
- Built by: Doenges, Charles
- MPS: Thompson Falls MRA
- NRHP reference No.: 86002784
- Added to NRHP: October 7, 1986

Preston House, at 205 Ferry St. in Thompson Falls, Montana, was built in 1909 by builder Charles H. Doenges, who was the major builder/contractor in Thompson Falls during 1905 to 1913. It was listed on the National Register of Historic Places in 1986. It has also been known as Brown House.

It was originally the home of Celia Preston, a member of the Eugene Preston family which operated a livery/teamster/excavation business on Preston Street in Thompson Falls. The house was sold by the Preston family in 1938; it was then owned by various individuals and eventually by a Brown family, owners as of date of NRHP listing.

The house was deemed "significant as an excellent example of one of the numerous houses that Charles Doenges constructed in the early 1900s, and for its association with the Eugene Preston family, for which Preston Avenue in Thompson Falls was named."
