= Benjamin Hoyt House =

Historic house in Massachusetts, United States

- U.S. National Register of Historic Places
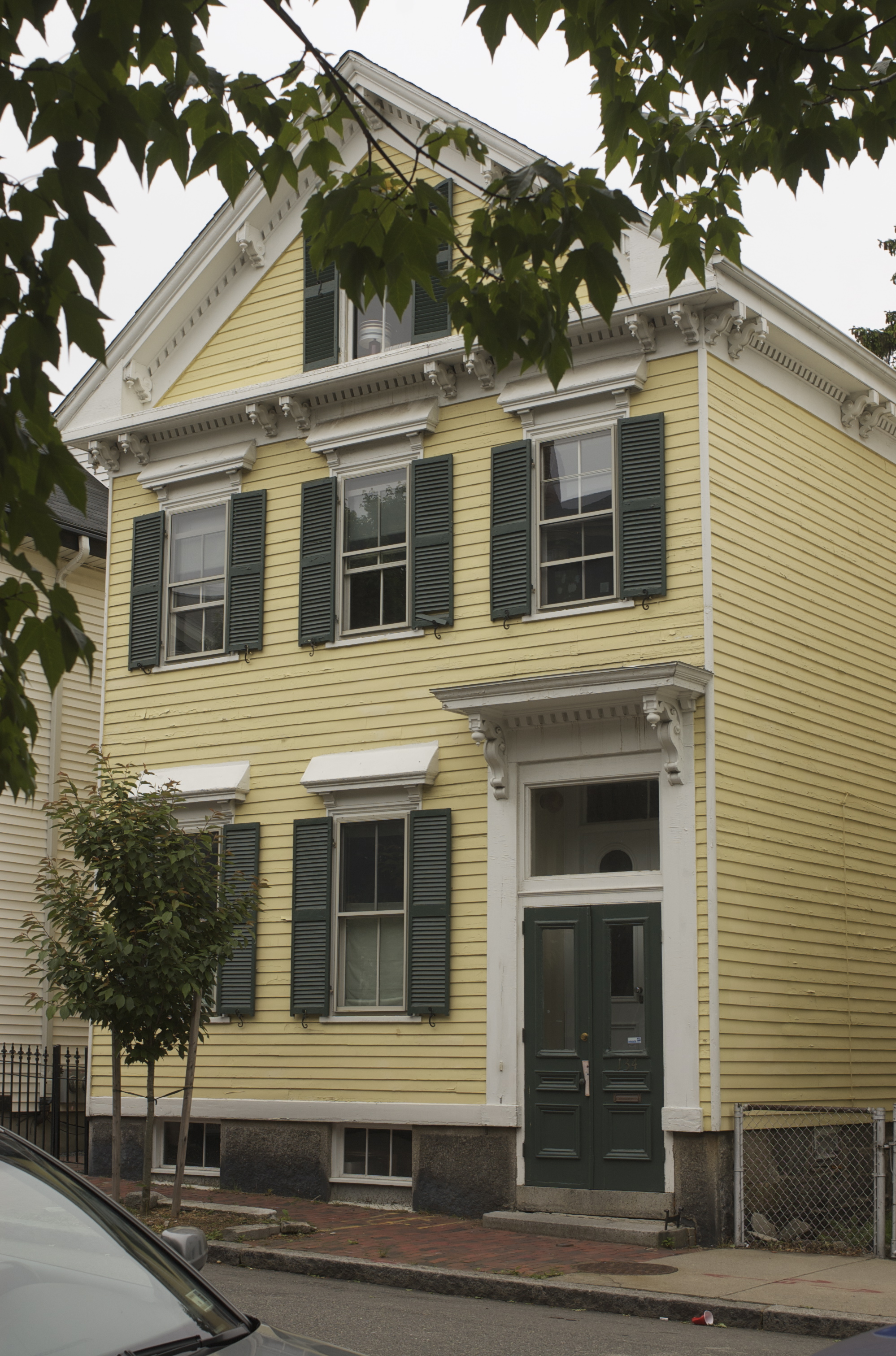

- Location within Massachusetts Location within the United States
- Location: Cambridge, Massachusetts
- Coordinates: 42°22′14.8″N 71°05′4.3″W
- Built: 1868
- MPS: Cambridge MRA
- NRHP reference No.: 82001953
- Added to NRHP: April 13, 1982

The Benjamin Hoyt House is a historic house located at 134 Otis Street in Cambridge, Massachusetts.

== Description and history ==
The 2 1/2-story wood-frame house was built in 1868, and is one of the only bracketed Italianate houses to survive in East Cambridge. It has a front-facing gable whose cornice includes dentil moulding and brackets, and whose fully pedimented gable end has a round-arch window in the tympanum area. The main roof cornice also has dentil moulding and paired brackets, and the front windows have slightly projecting lintel caps.

The house was listed on the National Register of Historic Places on April 13, 1982.

== See also ==
- National Register of Historic Places listings in Cambridge, Massachusetts
