= Preston–Lafreniere Farm =

- U.S. National Register of Historic Places
- U.S. Historic district
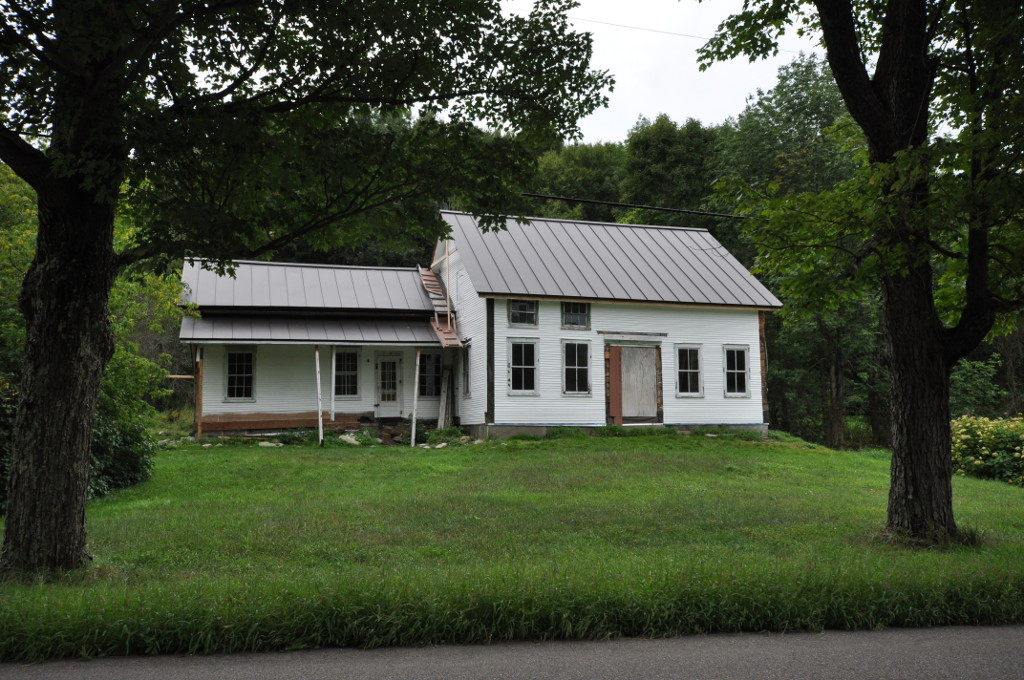

- Location within Vermont Location within the United States
- Location: Jct. of Duxbury Rd. and Honey Hollow Rd., Bolton, Vermont
- Coordinates: 44°22′25″N 72°54′25″W
- Area: 60 acres (24 ha)
- Built: 1810
- Architectural style: English Barn
- MPS: Agricultural Resources of Vermont MPS
- NRHP reference No.: 99000138
- Added to NRHP: February 5, 1999

The Preston–Lafreniere Farm is a historic farm property at Duxbury and Honey Hollow Roads in Bolton, Vermont. Established in the early 19th century, it was operated by five generations of the Preston family through the 1990s. The property includes both a house and barn that date to the early 19th century. It was listed on the National Register of Historic Places in 1999, and is subject to a conservation easement held by the state.

== Description and history ==
The Preston–Lafreniere Farm is set in a rural area of southwestern Bolton, on 60 acres (24 ha) bounded on the north by the Winooski River and the east by Preston Brook, which descends from the northern slope of Camel's Hump to the south. Most of the current property is open fields, the upland woodlots historically associated with the property have been acquired by the state and folded into Camel's Hump State Park. The farmstead includes a house and several barns, some of which are connected to each other. The house is set facing north at the southwest corner of Duxbury Road (which roughly parallels the river) and Honey Hollow Road (which parallels the brook), while the barns are across Duxbury Road to the north. The house is a vernacular 1-1/2 story wood frame structure, with a gabled roof and clapboarded exterior. A saltbox-shaped single-story addition extends to the left side. The interior is relatively little-altered since the turn of the 20th century, the principal change being the introduction of a bathroom about 1940. Across the street stand three barns, two of which are English barns dating to the early decades of the farm's development. The third is a c. 1940 dairy barn.

The property was acquired by John Preston from the town's original proprietors in 1790, and he became one of the town's first permanent settlers. The house and two barns were built by him between 1810 and 1830 (dates of construction are uncertain due to difficulties with the documentary record. The property was farmed by five generations of Prestons, and it was only under the last generation (married into the Lafreniere family) that any significant modernization took place. Even then, the c. 1940 dairy barn was hand-built by Leo Lafreniere, albeit using modern balloon frame construction. The Lafrenieres granted the state a conservation easement on these 60 acres in 1991, and sold the state over 400 acres (160 ha) of uplands for inclusion in Camels Hump State Park, whose conservation Bertha Preston Lafreniere had championed.

== See also ==
- National Register of Historic Places listings in Chittenden County, Vermont
