= Bull River (Montana) =

River in Montana

Coordinates: 48°01′42″N 115°50′40″W

The Bull River in Montana is a tributary of the Clark Fork River, west of the Continental Divide. The River's discharge is 389 cubic feet per second source Snowshoe Lake 48°13'42.0"N 115°42'47.2"W.
