= Sanders County, Montana =

County in Montana, United States

- County
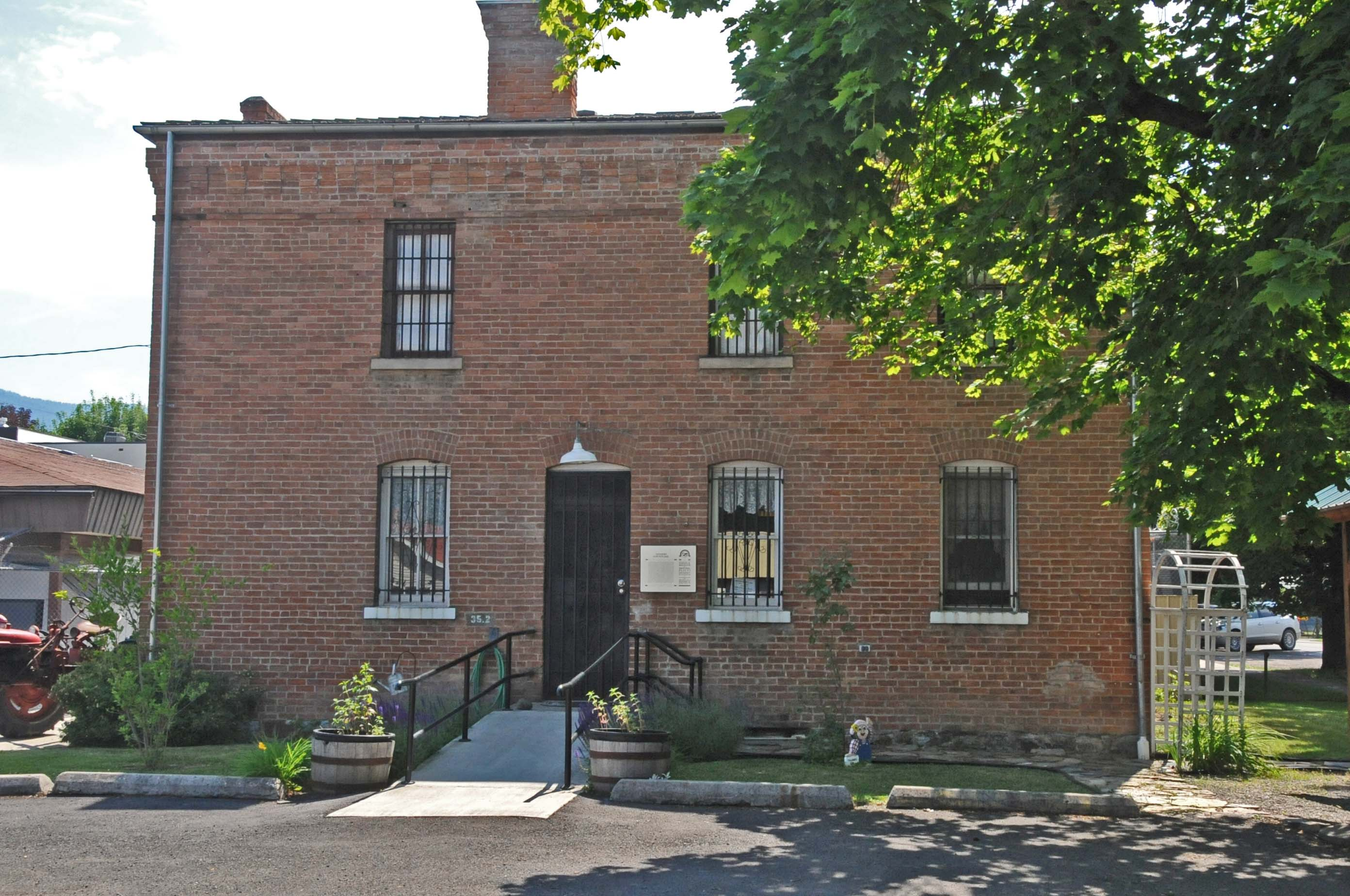
- Historic Sanders County Jail in Thompson Falls, Montana

- Location within the U.S. state of Montana
- Coordinates: 47°40′N 115°08′W
- Country: United States
- State: Montana
- Founded: March 1, 1906
- Named for: Wilbur Fisk Sanders
- Seat: Thompson Falls
- Largest city: Thompson Falls

Area
  - Total: 2,790 sq mi (7,200 km^{2})
  - Land: 2,761 sq mi (7,150 km^{2})
  - Water: 29 sq mi (75 km^{2}) 1.1%

Population (2020)
  - Total: 12,400
  - Estimate (2025): 14,062 ▲
  - Density: 4.49/sq mi (1.73/km^{2})
- Time zone: UTC−7 (Mountain)
  - Summer (DST): UTC−6 (MDT)
- Congressional district: 1st
- Website: www.co.sanders.mt.us
- Montana county number 35

Sanders County is a county in the U.S. state of Montana. As of the 2020 census, the population was 12,400. Its county seat is Thompson Falls. The county was founded in 1905.

It has an annual county fair with rodeo at Plains.

== Geography ==
According to the United States Census Bureau, the county has a total area of 2,790 square miles (7,200 km^{2}), of which 2,761 square miles (7,150 km^{2}) is land and 29 square miles (75 km^{2}) (1.1%) is water.

Sanders County lies on the state's western border; thus it shares the border with Idaho to the west. It is part of the Coeur d'Alene Mountains in the Bitterroot Range. The Clark Fork River flows southeast to northwest through the middle of the county, with the Bitterroot Mountains to the south and the Cabinet Mountains to the north.

It is partially arid, with the west-facing mountain slopes capturing the most rain: ranging from nearly 40 inches a year in Heron (similar to Seattle's annual precipitation) on the Western end of the county to less than 12 inches per year in Dixon on the East end.

During the last ice age, this was the area that dammed the glacial Lake Missoula. When the ice dam broke, the resulting floods created the Scablands in eastern Washington.

=== Adjacent counties ===
- Lincoln County – north
- Flathead County – northeast
- Lake County – east
- Missoula County – southeast
- Mineral County – south
- Shoshone County, Idaho – west/Pacific Time Border
- Bonner County, Idaho – northwest/Pacific Time Border

=== National protected areas ===
- Kaniksu National Forest (part)
- Kootenai National Forest (part)
- Lolo National Forest (part)
- Bison Range (part)

=== Fauna ===
A variety of birds and other wildlife are found in Sanders County. The Tufted duck has been observed along the Bull River. An amphibian, the Rough-skinned Newt, has a disjunctive population at Thompson Falls which is un-contiguous with the remainder of the Western United States population of this species.

Sanders County is a "destination hunting locale" with trophy specimens of White-tailed Deer (Odocoileus virginianus), Mule Deer (Odocoileus hemionus), Rocky Mountain Elk (Cervus canadensis nelsoni), Shiras Moose (Alces alces Shirasi), Mountain Goat(Oreamnos americanus), and Bighorn Sheep (Ovis canadensis Canadensis) rounding out huntable ungulate species and Black Bear, Cougar and Wolves comprising the huntable carnivores.

Rocky Mountain Bighorns are regularly hunted in the county. Grizzly bear, the Montana state animal, are also found in the county, but as an endangered species, hunting them is prohibited. Montana had the last huntable population of Grizzlies in the lower 48, allowing 10 bears a year (natural deaths, poaching and other causes of death were included in that total to decide when season closed) as late as the 1990s. Only Alaska allows hunting for Grizzlies at present.

Western Meadowlark, the state bird are found sparsely in the meadow areas of Sanders County along with Redwing Blackbird and Mountain Bluebirds.

The westslope cutthroat trout (Onchorynchus clarki lewisi) is native to the drainages of Sanders County. The threatened native bull trout relies on westslopes as a major prey species in its piscivorous diet. Catch and release fishing is required to maintain fishable populations of the two natives, which now compete with introduced rainbow trout, and warm-water species, such as largemouth bass, yellow perch, Northern Pike, and walleyes that have been introduced and thrive in the modified habitat of the Clark Fork River's reservoirs.

=== Flora ===
Sanders County is part of the mountainous western third of Montana. It lies entirely on the western slopes of the Rocky Mountains with a mixed coniferous forest dominating the plant community. Douglas fir/Ponderosa pine (Montana state tree) climax plant community dominate much of the county, but there are numerous other conifers found there as well in pockets of micro-climates suited to their needs. These include Western red cedar, Western Hemlock, Mountain Hemlock, White Spruce, Subalpine Fir, Grand Fir, Western White Pine, Lodgepole Pine and one of the most spectacular, Western larch, one of a handful of deciduous conifers that turn gold in the autumn before dropping their needles.

Numerous broadleaf species proliferate in Sanders County: Rocky Mountain Maple, Red Alder, Paperbark Birch, Chokecherry, cottonwood, and poplar.

Arguably the most popular broad-leaf shrub in Sanders County is the Rocky Mountain huckleberry (Vaccinium membranaceum). Trout Creek, Montana 59874 is considered the "Huckleberry Capital of Montana" and holds an annual huckleberry celebration in August. Though related to the common blueberry (Vaccinium corymbosum) very few have managed to grow Rocky Mountain huckleberry in domestic cultivation. It is found in plant communities with beargrass (Xerophyllum tenax), a perennial found in burned or logged-over areas of the county's mountains.

The bitterroot (Lewisia rediviva), the state flower, is found in limited quantities in Sanders County.

== Demographics ==
Historical population
Census	Pop.	Note	%±
1910	3,713		—
1920	4,903		32.0%
1930	5,692		16.1%
1940	6,926		21.7%
1950	6,983		0.8%
1960	6,880		−1.5%
1970	7,093		3.1%
1980	8,675		22.3%
1990	8,669		−0.1%
2000	10,227		18.0%
2010	11,413		11.6%
2020	12,400		8.6%
2025 (est.)	14,062	▲	13.4%
U.S. Decennial Census; 1790–1960 1900–1990; 1990–2000 2010–2020

=== 2020 census ===
As of the 2020 census, the county had a population of 12,400. Of the residents, 17.6% were under the age of 18 and 32.2% were 65 years of age or older; the median age was 55.2 years. For every 100 females there were 103.6 males, and for every 100 females age 18 and over there were 103.2 males. 0.0% of residents lived in urban areas and 100.0% lived in rural areas.

The racial makeup of the county was 87.8% White, 0.2% Black or African American, 3.7% American Indian and Alaska Native, 0.5% Asian, 1.2% from some other race, and 6.6% from two or more races. Hispanic or Latino residents of any race comprised 2.8% of the population.

There were 5,533 households in the county, of which 20.1% had children under the age of 18 living with them and 20.9% had a female householder with no spouse or partner present. About 31.3% of all households were made up of individuals and 18.5% had someone living alone who was 65 years of age or older.

There were 6,800 housing units, of which 18.6% were vacant. Among occupied housing units, 78.4% were owner-occupied and 21.6% were renter-occupied. The homeowner vacancy rate was 1.8% and the rental vacancy rate was 6.6%.

=== 2010 census ===
As of the 2010 census, there were 11,413 people, 5,121 households, and 3,204 families residing in the county. The population density was 4.1 inhabitants per square mile (1.6/km^{2}). There were 6,678 housing units at an average density of 2.4 per square mile (0.93/km^{2}). The racial makeup of the county was 91.6% white, 4.4% American Indian, 0.3% Asian, 0.1% black or African American, 0.4% from other races, and 3.1% from two or more races. Those of Hispanic or Latino origin made up 2.0% of the population. In terms of ancestry, 32.2% were German, 16.4% were English, 16.1% were Irish, 9.1% were Norwegian, 6.3% were Swedish, and 3.3% were American.

Of the 5,121 households, 22.4% had children under the age of 18 living with them, 52.8% were married couples living together, 6.2% had a female householder with no husband present, 37.4% were non-families, and 32.8% of all households were made up of individuals. The average household size was 2.19 and the average family size was 2.75. The median age was 49.8 years.

The median income for a household in the county was $30,622 and the median income for a family was $37,514. Males had a median income of $32,857 versus $22,274 for females. The per capita income for the county was $18,472. About 16.6% of families and 21.3% of the population were below the poverty line, including 33.9% of those under age 18 and 11.1% of those age 65 or over.

== Transportation ==
The Hot Springs Airport is a county-owned public-use airport located east of Hot Springs.

== Politics ==
Sanders County is a reliable state bellwether, having voted for Montana's statewide winner in every presidential election since 1928. Bill Clinton carried this county in 1992; he lost this county by 10% in 1996 to Republican Bob Dole. Clinton is the only Democratic candidate to win this county in the past 54 years. Republican Donald Trump won the vote here in 2016, 2020, and 2024. In 2024 Trump won the vote with 76.2%, the highest margin by any Presidential candidate ever in Sanders County.

United States presidential election results for Sanders County, Montana
Year	Republican		Democratic		Third party(ies)	
Year	No.	%	No.	%	No.	%
1908	473	55.00%	325	37.79%	62	7.21%
1912	257	21.29%	414	34.30%	536	44.41%
1916	793	37.32%	1,178	55.44%	154	7.25%
1920	1,035	51.49%	741	36.87%	234	11.64%
1924	588	28.65%	188	9.16%	1,276	62.18%
1928	1,142	53.67%	873	41.02%	113	5.31%
1932	760	29.22%	1,577	60.63%	264	10.15%
1936	718	26.25%	1,788	65.37%	229	8.37%
1940	1,088	38.94%	1,634	58.48%	72	2.58%
1944	1,070	46.97%	1,184	51.98%	24	1.05%
1948	1,191	43.04%	1,425	51.50%	151	5.46%
1952	1,724	56.01%	1,311	42.59%	43	1.40%
1956	1,649	52.05%	1,519	47.95%	0	0.00%
1960	1,497	50.17%	1,469	49.23%	18	0.60%
1964	1,163	38.60%	1,836	60.94%	14	0.46%
1968	1,459	48.70%	1,242	41.46%	295	9.85%
1972	1,779	54.72%	1,197	36.82%	275	8.46%
1976	1,738	48.60%	1,725	48.24%	113	3.16%
1980	2,194	54.86%	1,395	34.88%	410	10.25%
1984	2,467	58.68%	1,654	39.34%	83	1.97%
1988	2,152	51.24%	1,959	46.64%	89	2.12%
1992	1,361	30.20%	1,689	37.48%	1,456	32.31%
1996	2,043	43.83%	1,573	33.75%	1,045	22.42%
2000	3,144	66.60%	1,165	24.68%	412	8.73%
2004	3,461	67.16%	1,502	29.15%	190	3.69%
2008	3,563	60.72%	1,970	33.57%	335	5.71%
2012	3,980	67.45%	1,720	29.15%	201	3.41%
2016	4,286	72.00%	1,218	20.46%	449	7.54%
2020	5,660	74.25%	1,820	23.88%	143	1.88%
2024	6,150	76.19%	1,705	21.12%	217	2.69%

== Communities ==
=== City ===
- Thompson Falls (county seat)

Population: 1,336

=== Towns ===
- Hot Springs

Population: 557

- Plains

Population: 1,106

=== Communities (All CDPs) ===
- Belknap

Population: 161

- Camas

Population: 57

- Heron

Population: 173

- Lonepine

Population: 177

- Niarada (partial)

Population: 28

- Noxon

Population: 255

- Old Agency

Population: 81

- Paradise

Population: 166

- Sčilíp (formerly Dixon)

Population: 221

- Trout Creek

Population: 277

- Weeksville

Population: 81

=== Unincorporated communities ===
- Bend
- Camas Prairie
- Donlan
- Eddy
- Larchwood
- Perma
- Quinns
- Talc
- Tuscor
- White Pine

== See also ==
- List of lakes in Sanders County, Montana
- List of mountains in Sanders County, Montana
- National Register of Historic Places listings in Sanders County, Montana
