= Thompson Falls, Montana =

City in Montana, United States

- City
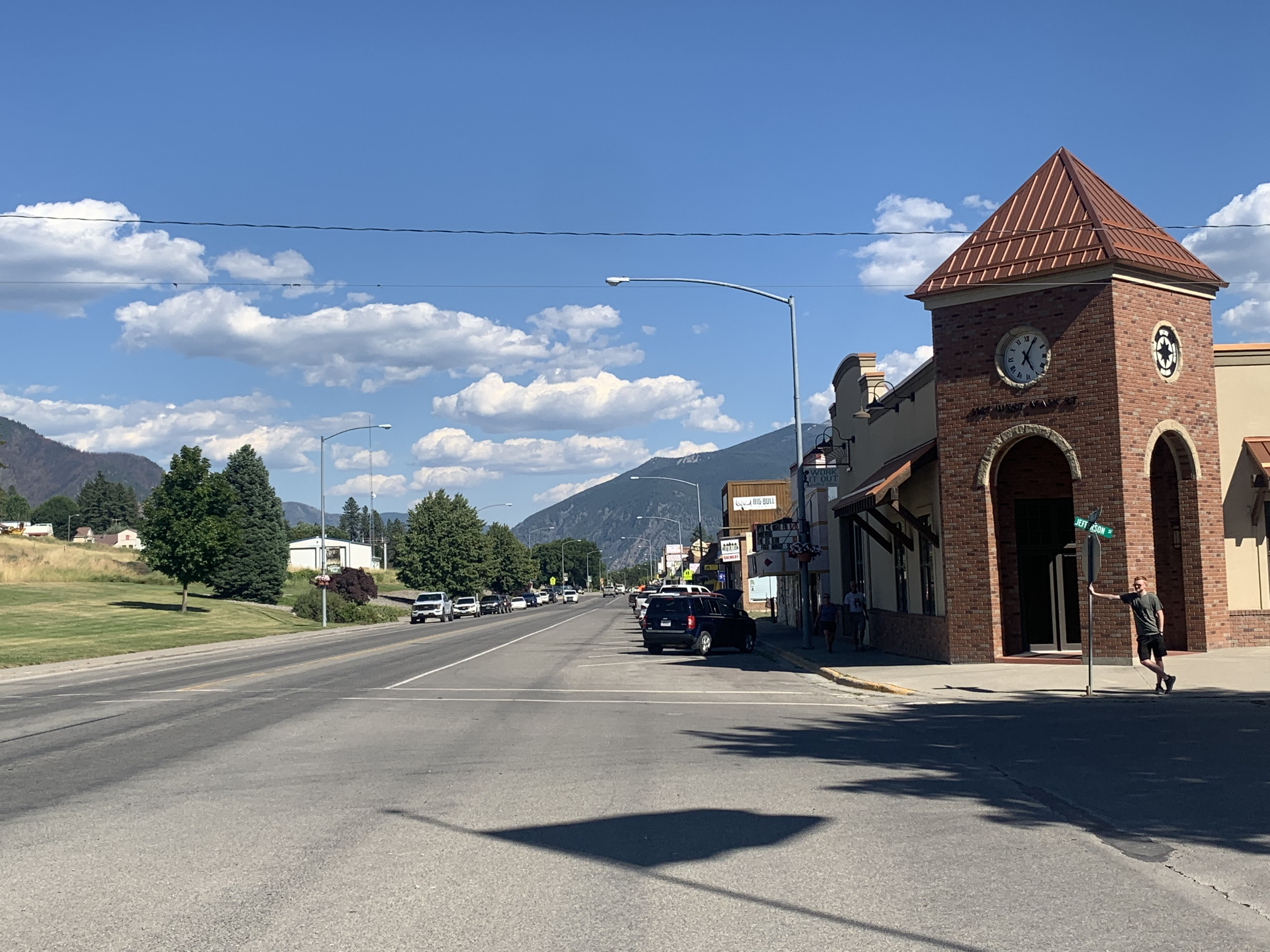
- Downtown Thompson Falls
- Motto: "Genuine In Nature"
- Location of Thompson Falls, Montana
- Coordinates: 47°35′48″N 115°20′37″W
- Country: United States
- State: Montana
- County: Sanders
- Founded: 1882

Area
  - Total: 1.59 sq mi (4.13 km^{2})
  - Land: 1.59 sq mi (4.13 km^{2})
  - Water: 0 sq mi (0.00 km^{2})
- Elevation: 2,556 ft (779 m)

Population (2020)
  - Total: 1,336
  - Density: 838.0/sq mi (323.57/km^{2})
- Time zone: UTC-7 (Mountain (MST))
  - Summer (DST): UTC-6 (MDT)
- ZIP code: 59873
- Area code: 406
- FIPS code: 30-73825
- GNIS feature ID: 0792090
- Website: cityofthompsonfalls.com

Thompson Falls is a city in and the county seat of Sanders County, Montana. The population was 1,336 at the time of the 2020 census.

== History ==
Thompson Falls was named after British explorer, geographer and fur trader David Thompson, who founded a North West Company fur trading post called Saleesh House in 1809. The community is located next to natural waterfalls on the Clark Fork river. The settlement of the Oregon Boundary Dispute in 1846, ended joint occupancy with Britain and established the border with British North America and made the region firmly American. The arrival of the railroad in 1881 brought activity to the area. Two years later, when the gold rush hit nearby Cœur d'Alene, the town grew to accommodate the men going over the Murray Trail to the mines. In 1885 John Russell bought 40 acres (160,000 m^{2}) and plotted the town site.

Thompson Falls was founded in 1882. It was part of Missoula County until 1906, when it became part of Sanders County.

Thompson Falls was established in 1910.

The Thompson Falls Dam, in operation since 1915, was constructed atop the original falls.

== Geography ==
Thompson Falls is located in the Clark Fork Valley at an elevation of 2,419 feet (737 m). The Clark Fork River flows on the southern side of town. It is next to the Cabinet Mountains.

Thompson Falls State Park is 2 miles (3.2 km) northwest of town. It offers a boat launch, campsites, and nature trails.

According to the United States Census Bureau, the city has a total area of 1.73 square miles (4.48 km^{2}), all land.

=== Ecology ===
An amphibian, the rough-skinned newt, has a population at Thompson Falls which is noncontiguous with the remainder of the Western US population of the species.

In 2010, a fish ladder was completed consisting of 48 pools, each one foot higher than the last, enabling native fish, including bull trout (Salvelinus confluentus) to pass the 913-foot Thompson Falls Dam for the first time in nearly a century.

=== Climate ===
Under the Köppen climate classification, depending on the variant used, Thompson Falls has either an oceanic climate (Cfb) or a warm-summer humid continental climate (Dfb). Winters are among the very warmest in the state, though the area lacks the very warm chinook winds that blow east of the Rockies. The climate is similar to that of nearby Trout Creek.

Climate data for Thompson Falls, Montana (1991–2020 normals, extremes 1956–present)
Month	Jan	Feb	Mar	Apr	May	Jun	Jul	Aug	Sep	Oct	Nov	Dec	Year
Record high °F (°C)	63 (17)	71 (22)	80 (27)	93 (34)	99 (37)	103 (39)	106 (41)	107 (42)	105 (41)	88 (31)	74 (23)	61 (16)	107 (42)
Mean daily maximum °F (°C)	34.0 (1.1)	39.8 (4.3)	49.4 (9.7)	58.2 (14.6)	68.4 (20.2)	74.5 (23.6)	86.4 (30.2)	86.2 (30.1)	75.4 (24.1)	58.0 (14.4)	41.3 (5.2)	32.9 (0.5)	58.7 (14.8)
Daily mean °F (°C)	29.1 (−1.6)	32.3 (0.2)	39.4 (4.1)	46.3 (7.9)	54.9 (12.7)	61.1 (16.2)	69.5 (20.8)	68.8 (20.4)	59.8 (15.4)	46.9 (8.3)	35.3 (1.8)	28.7 (−1.8)	47.7 (8.7)
Mean daily minimum °F (°C)	24.1 (−4.4)	24.9 (−3.9)	29.4 (−1.4)	34.4 (1.3)	41.4 (5.2)	47.8 (8.8)	52.7 (11.5)	51.5 (10.8)	44.3 (6.8)	35.9 (2.2)	29.4 (−1.4)	24.5 (−4.2)	36.7 (2.6)
Record low °F (°C)	−22 (−30)	−16 (−27)	−6 (−21)	17 (−8)	24 (−4)	32 (0)	35 (2)	32 (0)	20 (−7)	6 (−14)	−7 (−22)	−25 (−32)	−25 (−32)
Average precipitation inches (mm)	2.34 (59)	1.94 (49)	1.99 (51)	1.65 (42)	2.09 (53)	2.19 (56)	0.88 (22)	0.89 (23)	0.97 (25)	2.16 (55)	2.64 (67)	2.31 (59)	22.05 (560)
Average snowfall inches (cm)	2.5 (6.4)	0.6 (1.5)	1.2 (3.0)	0.3 (0.76)	0.0 (0.0)	0.0 (0.0)	0.0 (0.0)	0.0 (0.0)	0.0 (0.0)	0.7 (1.8)	2.5 (6.4)	7.5 (19)	15.3 (39)
Average precipitation days (≥ 0.01 in)	17.9	14.6	16.0	15.4	13.9	13.0	6.7	5.3	7.9	13.4	16.9	17.1	158.1
Average snowy days (≥ 0.1 in)	2.3	1.0	0.5	0.2	0.0	0.0	0.0	0.0	0.0	0.1	1.2	2.3	7.6
Source: NOAA

== Demographics ==
Historical population
Census	Pop.	Note	%±
1910	325		—
1920	508		56.3%
1930	468		−7.9%
1940	736		57.3%
1950	851		15.6%
1960	1,274		49.7%
1970	1,356		6.4%
1980	1,478		9.0%
1990	1,319		−10.8%
2000	1,321		0.2%
2010	1,313		−0.6%
2020	1,336		1.8%
U.S. Decennial Census

=== 2010 census ===
As of the census of 2010, there were 1,313 people, 618 households, and 362 families living in the city. The population density was 759.0 inhabitants per square mile (293.1/km^{2}). There were 681 housing units at an average density of 393.6 units per square mile (152.0 units/km^{2}). The racial makeup of the city was 94.9% White, 0.2% African American, 1.6% Native American, 0.5% Asian, 0.6% from other races, and 2.1% from two or more races. Hispanic or Latino of any race were 1.6% of the population.

There were 618 households, of which 24.9% had children under the age of 18 living with them, 46.1% were married couples living together, 9.1% had a female householder with no husband present, 3.4% had a male householder with no wife present, and 41.4% were non-families. 37.4% of all households were made up of individuals, and 19.4% had someone living alone who was 65 years of age or older. The average household size was 2.11 and the average family size was 2.73.

The median age in the city was 46.2 years. 21.2% of residents were under the age of 18; 5.3% were between the ages of 18 and 24; 22.1% were from 25 to 44; 28.6% were from 45 to 64; and 22.7% were 65 years of age or older. The gender makeup of the city was 48.7% male and 51.3% female.

=== 2000 census ===
As of the census of 2000, there were 1,321 people, 549 households, and 357 families living in the city. The population density was 708.5 inhabitants per square mile (273.6/km^{2}). There were 619 housing units at an average density of 332.0 units per square mile (128.2 units/km^{2}). The racial makeup of the city was 96.74% White, 0.23% African American, 1.44% Native American, 0.15% Asian, 0.08% from other races, and 1.36% from two or more races. Hispanic or Latino of any race were 0.98% of the population.

There were 549 households, out of which 28.1% had children under the age of 18 living with them, 53.7% were married couples living together, 9.1% had a female householder with no husband present, and 34.8% were non-families. 31.0% of all households were made up of individuals, and 14.9% had someone living alone who was 65 years of age or older. The average household size was 2.36 and the average family size was 2.92.

In the city, the population was spread out, with 25.1% under the age of 18, 6.4% from 18 to 24, 24.3% from 25 to 44, 27.2% from 45 to 64, and 17.0% who were 65 years of age or older. The median age was 41 years. For every 100 females there were 95.4 males. For every 100 females age 18 and over, there were 92.0 males.

The median income for a household in the city was $28,103, and the median income for a family was $31,544. Males had a median income of $28,125 versus $18,333 for females. The per capita income for the city was $13,245. About 13.6% of families and 16.1% of the population were below the poverty line, including 20.2% of those under age 18 and 18.6% of those age 65 or over.

== Government ==
The city of Thompson Falls has a mayor and city council. Both have a four year term. Gussie O'Connor was voted mayor in the 2025 elections.

In October 2023 mayor Jerry Lacy resigned. Raoul Ribeiro became acting mayor. Interviews were held during a city council meeting and Rusti Leivestad was unanimously selected to be mayor until the 2025 elections. She then ran unopposed for a city council seat.

== Education ==
Thompson Falls is served by the Thompson Falls Public Schools School District. The district has an elementary school, middle school and high school. Students attend Thompson Falls High School, a Class B school. They are known as the Blue Hawks. It offers eight sports to its students.

Thompson Falls Public Library is located in town.

== Media ==
The Sanders County Ledger is a weekly local newspaper. The Clark Fork Valley Press is a newspaper serving Sanders County and the Clark Fork Valley. It is printed weekly and also has an e-edition.

The FM radio station KTFZ is licensed in Thompson Falls. It is a satellite for Montana Public Radio.

== Infrastructure ==
Montana Highway 200 passes through town from east to west. Secondary Highway 471 intersects 200 at the western edge of town.

BNSF Railway’s 4th subdivision passes through town east to west from Missoula, MT to Sandpoint, Idaho. It is currently used for freight transportation, with revival of passenger service proposed. The line was built in the late 19th century by the Northern Pacific Railroad.

Thompson Falls Airport is a county-owned, public-use airport located three miles (4.8 km) southeast of town.

== Notable people ==
- Curtis Cochran, member of the Montana House of Representatives
- Jennifer Fielder, former member of the Montana Senate
- Greg Hinkle, former member of the Montana Senate
- Pat Ingraham, former member of the Montana House of Representatives
- Marc Racicot, 21st governor of Montana and former chair of the RNC
