= Clack =

Clack may refer to:

== People ==
=== Surname ===
- Arthur Baker-Clack (1877–1955), Australian impressionist artist
- Bobby Clack (1850–1933), English baseball player
- Bobby Clack (actor) (1926–1986), American actor
- Boyd Clack (born 1951), Welsh writer, actor and musician
- Brenda Clack (born 1945), American politician from Michigan
- Charles Clack (1857–1932), American politician from Wisconsin
- Darryl Clack (born 1963), American football player
- Doris Hargrett Clack (1928–1995), American librarian
- Floyd Clack (1940–2025), American educator and politician in Michigan
- Frank Clack (1912–1995), English footballer
- Jenny Clack (1947–2020), paleonthologist and evolution specialist
- Jerry Clack (1926–2019), American educator
- Jim Clack (1947–2006), American football player
- John Clack (1757–1833), American politician from Tennessee
- Kris Clack (born 1977), American basketball player
- Nicholas Clack (born 1930), British rower
- Peter Clack (fl. 1974–2011), Australian musician
- Spencer Clack (1740–1832), American politician from Tennessee
- Ted Clack (1896–1984), English footballer
- Thomas Clack (1876–1951), South African cricketer
- Zoanne Clack (born 1968), American television producer and writer
- John Forrester-Clack (fl. 2009), Australian artist
- Rex Lewis-Clack (born 1995), American pianist

=== Given name ===
- Travis Clack Henderson (1836–1919), American politician from Texas
- Elijah Sterling Clack Robertson (1820–1879), American military officer from Texas
- Clack Stone (fl. 1827–1839), American militia captain during the 1832 Black Hawk War

=== Nickname ===
- Clack, of Click and Clack, the hosts of Car Talk

== Fictional people ==
- Drusilla Clack (Miss Clack), a character in the 1868 novel The Moonstone
- Clack the Miller, a character in the 1662 play Grim the Collier of Croydon

== Places ==
- Clack, Mississippi, community in Mississippi, U.S.
- Clack House, house in Fayetteville, Arkansas, U.S.
- Clack Island, island in Bathurst Bay, Australia
- Clack Mill Brook, now known as Siston Brook, in South Gloucestershire, England
- H. Earl Clack House, house in Havre, Montana, U.S.
- H. Earl Clack Service Station, service station in Saco, Montana, U.S.

== Other ==
- Agfa Clack, box camera
- Clickity Clack (fl. 2015–2018), Canadian horse

== See also ==
- Clackamas (disambiguation)
- Clackers (disambiguation)
- Claque
