= Winkfield (surname) =

Winkfield is a surname. Notable people with the name include:

- Alexandra Winkfield Timpson (1946–2016), English children's rights campaigner
- Jimmy Winkfield (c. 1880–1974), American jockey and horse trainer
- Karen Winkfield (born 1970), American radiation oncologist and physician-scientist
- Trevor Winkfield (born 1944), English artist and writer

== See also ==
- Unca Eliza Winkfield
- Winkfield
