= BeCogent =

beCogent was a Scottish call centre company that provided outsourced telesales, customer relations and helpdesk services to a variety of companies. The company was founded in 1999 (originally as 'Cogent Communications') by Dermot Jenkinson, Ron Peerenboom, Povl Verder Jeff Swanson and John Devlin. The company employed over 3000 across the main headquarters in Airdrie, North Lanarkshire, and other call centres located in Glasgow, Erskine and Kilmarnock. The company was a member of the UK's National Outsourcing Association. Ron Peerenboom was awarded a 2002 Business Services Entrepreneur Award for his work with the business but was sacked soon after due to a falling out with Jenkinson. He was replaced by Charles Breslin but he too got himself sacked due to inappropriate behaviour towards staff. In 2008, the company was named UK Employer of the Year and both Scotland's Employer of the Year and Business of The Year at the Orange National Business Awards.

The company was acquired by Paris-based Teleperformance in 2010.
