= Jeeves of Belgravia =

Jeeves of Belgravia Ltd
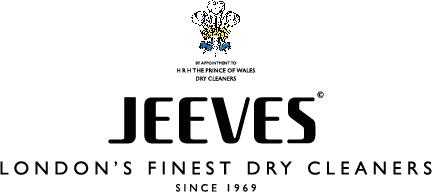
- Type: Private Ltd
- Industry: Cleaning products Cleaning services
- Founded: 1969
- Founder: Sydney Jacob; David Sandeluss
- Headquarters: London, England, England
- Area served: Worldwide
- Key people: John Timpson; Will Lankston
- Services: Dry cleaning Cleaning products
- Website: www.jeevesofbelgravia.co.uk

Jeeves of Belgravia (or Jeeves) is a British multinational retailer which offers specialist dry cleaning, garment and accessories care services. The company is based in London and currently has over 30 branches in 14 cities around the world, including; London, New York, and Hong Kong.

== History ==
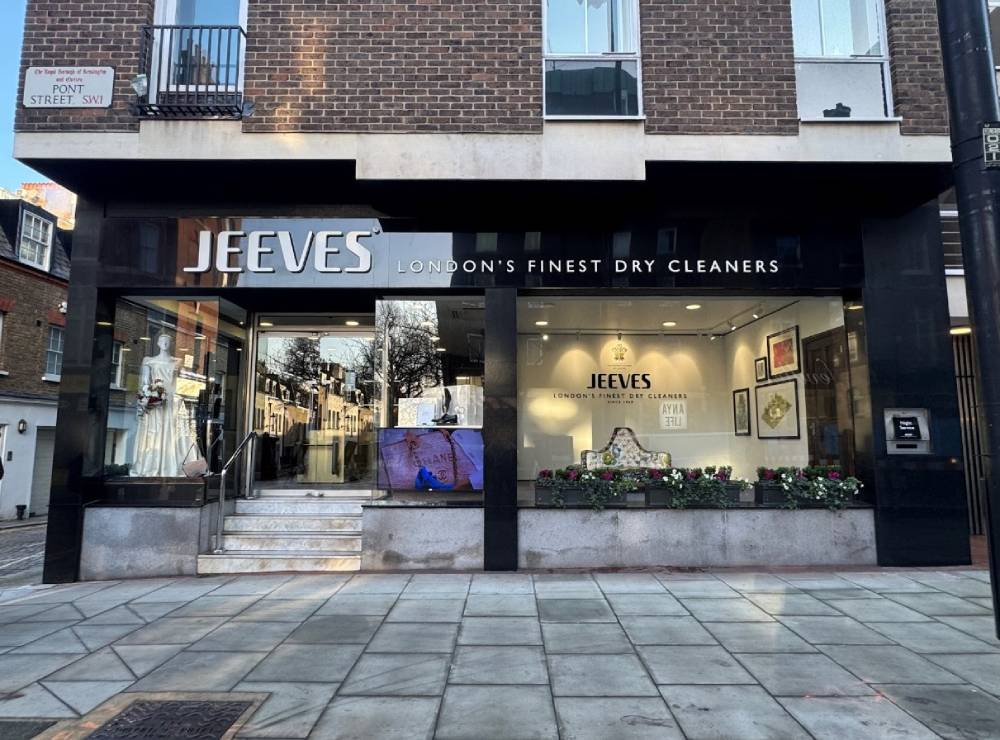
Jeeves of Belgravia, flagship store on Pont Street

The company was founded in 1969 by Sydney Jacob and David Sandeluss. After being granted permission from P.G. Wodehouse to use the Jeeves name, the pair opened a shop at 8-10 Pont Street in Belgravia, London offering a specialist dry cleaning service for luxury garments. This shop in Pont Street is still the flagship shop today.

Sandeluss later sold his shares in the business to Sydney Jacob, who brought his brother Ronald Jacob into the ownership of the company.

In 1980, the Jacob brothers sold Jeeves UK for £695,000 to women's clothing group Tricoville Ltd, under chairman Anthony Jacobs (no relation). At the same time, Tricoville also bought a 10% stake in Jeeves of Belgravia International, for £80,000. Jeeves was sold to Sketchley in 1987. The Sketchley retail business operated its own chain of high street dry cleaners, as well as owning the SupaSnaps photo processing chain. In 1998, Sketchley was acquired by Minit Group, the international key cutting and shoe repair brand. Then in 2003, the Jeeves business was purchased by Johnson Service Group which at the time, operated the largest chain of dry cleaners in the UK – Johnson Dry Cleaners. In 2017, the Timpson Group acquired the Johnson Dry Cleaners business for £8.25m, and thus acquired Jeeves of Belgravia and Jeeves International.

Jeeves opened its first overseas branch in New York in 1979. In 1994, the business opened its first branch in Hong Kong and then in 1995 Jeeves expanded to Jakarta. This international expansion has continued in recent years, with Jeeves now having branches in 13 countries around the world, including Philippines (Metro Manila), Singapore, Malaysia (Kuala Lumpur), Taiwan (Taipei), UAE (Abu Dhabi), Qatar (Doha) and Turkey. Jeeves has held a royal warrant for Dry Cleaning Services to HRH The Prince of Wales for more than 30 years.
