= Edward Timpson =

British politician (born 1973)

Edward Timpson CBE KC
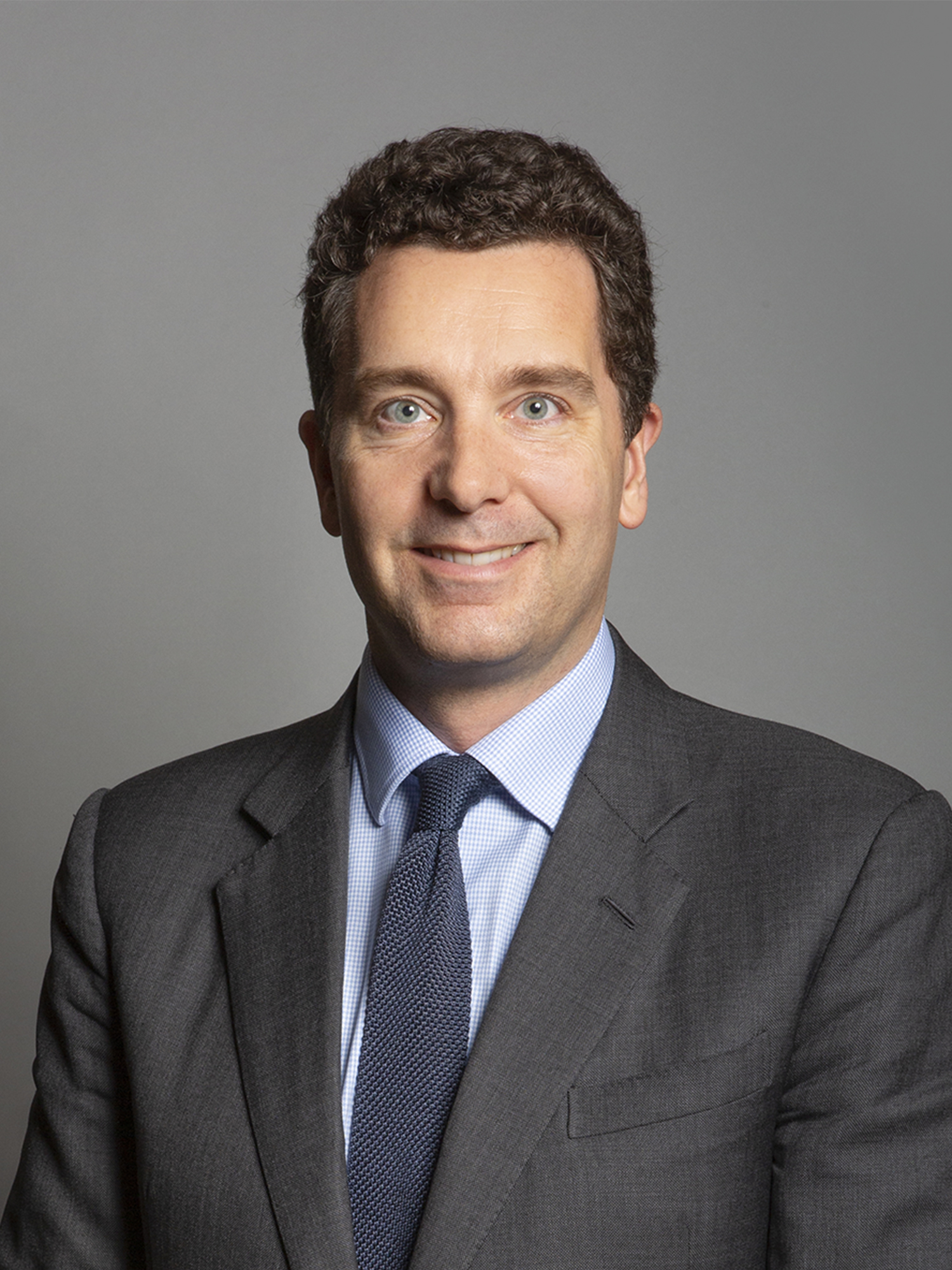
- Official portrait, 2019

Solicitor General for England and Wales
- In office 7 July 2022 – 7 September 2022
- Prime Minister: Boris Johnson
- Preceded by: Alex Chalk
- Succeeded by: Michael Tomlinson

Minister of State for Children and Families
- In office 12 May 2015 – 12 June 2017
- Prime Minister: David Cameron; Theresa May
- Preceded by: Sarah Teather
- Succeeded by: Robert Goodwill

Parliamentary Under-Secretary of State for Children and Families
- In office 4 September 2012 – 12 May 2015
- Prime Minister: David Cameron
- Preceded by: Tim Loughton
- Succeeded by: Sam Gyimah

Member of Parliament for Eddisbury
- In office 12 December 2019 – 30 May 2024
- Preceded by: Antoinette Sandbach
- Succeeded by: Constituency abolished

Member of Parliament for Crewe and Nantwich
- In office 22 May 2008 – 3 May 2017
- Preceded by: Gwyneth Dunwoody
- Succeeded by: Laura Smith

Personal details
- Born: Anthony Edward Timpson; 26 December 1973 (age 52) Knutsford, Cheshire, England
- Party: Conservative
- Spouse: Julia Timpson
- Relations: James Timpson (brother)
- Children: 4
- Parent(s): John Timpson; Alex Timpson
- Education: Durham University (BA, Hatfield College)
- Website: edwardtimpson.com

Anthony Edward Timpson, CBE KC (born 26 December 1973) is a British former Conservative Party politician who served as the Member of Parliament (MP) for Eddisbury in Cheshire from 2019 to 2024. Timpson was previously the MP for neighbouring Crewe and Nantwich, winning a 2008 by-election and retaining the seat until the 2017 general election when he lost to the Labour Party candidate, Laura Smith, by 48 votes.

Timpson was Minister of State for Children and Families after the 2015 general election, having been promoted from Parliamentary Under-Secretary of State at the Department for Education.

He was appointed as Solicitor General for England and Wales in the July 2022 British cabinet reshuffle resulting from mass resignations from government which themselves resulted in resignation of Boris Johnson as Prime Minister. He was succeeded by Michael Tomlinson in September 2022.

== Early life ==
Timpson was born in Knutsford, Cheshire, in 1973. His father, Sir John Timpson, is the chairman and owner of the Timpson chain of shoe repair and key-cutting shops, which has been in the family for five generations and has over 2,000 stores in the UK and Ireland. Timpson grew up with an elder sister and brother, two younger adopted brothers, and over 80 children fostered by his parents. His mother, Alex Timpson, was appointed Member of the Order of the British Empire in 2006 for services to Children and Families. She died on 5 January 2016. His brother James is a Labour life peer who was a minister in the government of Keir Starmer from July 2024 to July 2026.

He was educated at Pownall Hall School, Alderley Edge County Primary School, Stockport Grammar Junior School, Terra Nova School and Uppingham School. He then attended Durham University (Hatfield College), where he gained a BA (Hons) in Politics, and the University of Law in London, where he gained a law degree (LLB).

Timpson was called to the Bar of England & Wales in 1998. He was a pupil barrister at One Garden Court Chambers in London, and from 1999 until his first election to Parliament in 2008 practised family law in Chester.

== Political career ==
=== First years in the Commons ===
In July 2007, Timpson was selected as the Conservative candidate for the Crewe and Nantwich constituency, an area which had been represented by the Labour MP Gwyneth Dunwoody since 1974. After Dunwoody died in April 2008, a by-election was called for May 2008. In the run-up to the by-election, Timpson was the target of a "toff" campaign by Labour, which attempted to paint him as "a rich man" who would not "understand the problems that people face day-to-day" in contrast to their candidate, Gwyneth Dunwoody's daughter Tamsin Dunwoody.

The Conservative campaign focused on local issues, such as crime and antisocial behaviour, closure of post offices and problems at Leighton Hospital, where two women in labour were turned away, as well as national issues – referring to Dunwoody as "Gordon Brown's candidate" and capitalising on dissatisfaction with the Labour government, in particular the removal of the 10% tax rate.

On 22 May 2008, Timpson was elected MP, gaining 20,539 votes (49% of the vote), a swing from Labour of 17.6%. This was the Conservatives' first gain in a by-election since 1982. He made his maiden speech in the House of Commons on 16 June 2008. Timpson served on the Joint Committee on Human Rights and the Children, Schools and Families Select Committee. He was a Vice-President of Conservative Friends of Poland.

=== 2010 to 2017 ===
Following his re-election on 7 May 2010, Timpson was appointed as Parliamentary Private Secretary of Theresa May, the Home Secretary. He was appointed as a Parliamentary Under-Secretary of State for Children and Families at the Department for Education in September 2012.

Timpson was named "Minister of the Year" in 2014 for pushing through reforms increasing the age of leaving foster care from 18 to 21, an initiative he had originally championed as a backbench committee chair. He credited his childhood experiences of living with a large family of fostered children.

He was re-elected in Crewe and Nantwich at the 2015 general election. On 11 May 2015, four days later, David Cameron announced he would become Minister of State for Children and Families at the Department for Education.

He held the children and families brief at the Department for Education from September 2012 to June 2017. Upon announcing his departure from Parliament in 2023, Timpson noted he was the longest-serving minister for children in UK history.

Timpson voted for Remain in the 2016 EU membership referendum.

He lost his seat at the 2017 general election by 48 votes after three recounts.

=== Work from 2017 to 2019 ===
Timpson went on to write a review into education, looking at school exclusions, off-rolling and Special Educational Needs (SEN) students.

In 2018, Timpson was appointed as the chair of the Children and Family Court Advisory and Support Service (CAFCASS), for the term from April 2018 to April 2021, succeeding Baroness Tyler of Enfield.

=== Return to Parliament ===
Having lost his former seat of Crewe and Nantwich in 2017, Timpson was selected as the Conservative Party's candidate for the neighbouring seat Eddisbury in the 2019 general election. He defeated Antoinette Sandbach (formerly a Conservative MP who was suspended from the party and then defected to the Liberal Democrats). His former seat also went back to the Conservatives.

Following his appointment as Solicitor General for England and Wales in July 2022 he received the customary appointment as Queen's Counsel on 20 July 2022. As a result, he was the last QC to be appointed during the reign of Queen Elizabeth II.

Timpson announced in February 2022 that he would be stepping down at the 2024 general election.

== Personal life ==
In June 2002, Timpson married Julia Helen Still in south Cheshire. The couple have a son and three daughters.

He has completed 15 marathons, including the New York City Marathon in 2007 and the London Marathon in 2008, raising over £15,000. His recreations are listed in Who's Who as "football (watching and playing), cricket, marathon running, travel, playing with my children".

Timpson was appointed Commander of the Order of the British Empire (CBE) in the 2018 New Year Honours for public and parliamentary service.

== Notes and references ==
Political offices
Preceded by Tim Loughton	Parliamentary Under Secretary of State for Children and Families; 2012–2015	Succeeded by Sam Gyimah as Parliamentary Under Secretary of State for Childcare and Education
Preceded by Sarah Teather	Minister for Children and Families; 2015–2017	Succeeded by Robert Goodwill
Legal offices
Preceded by Alex Chalk	Solicitor General for England and Wales; 2022	Succeeded by Michael Tomlinson
Parliament of the United Kingdom
Preceded by Gwyneth Dunwoody	Member of Parliament for Crewe and Nantwich; 2008–2017	Succeeded by Laura Smith
Preceded by Antoinette Sandbach	Member of Parliament for Eddisbury; 2019–2024	Constituency abolished
