= James Timpson, Baron Timpson =

British businessman and politician (born 1971)

The Right Honourable The Lord Timpson OBE DL
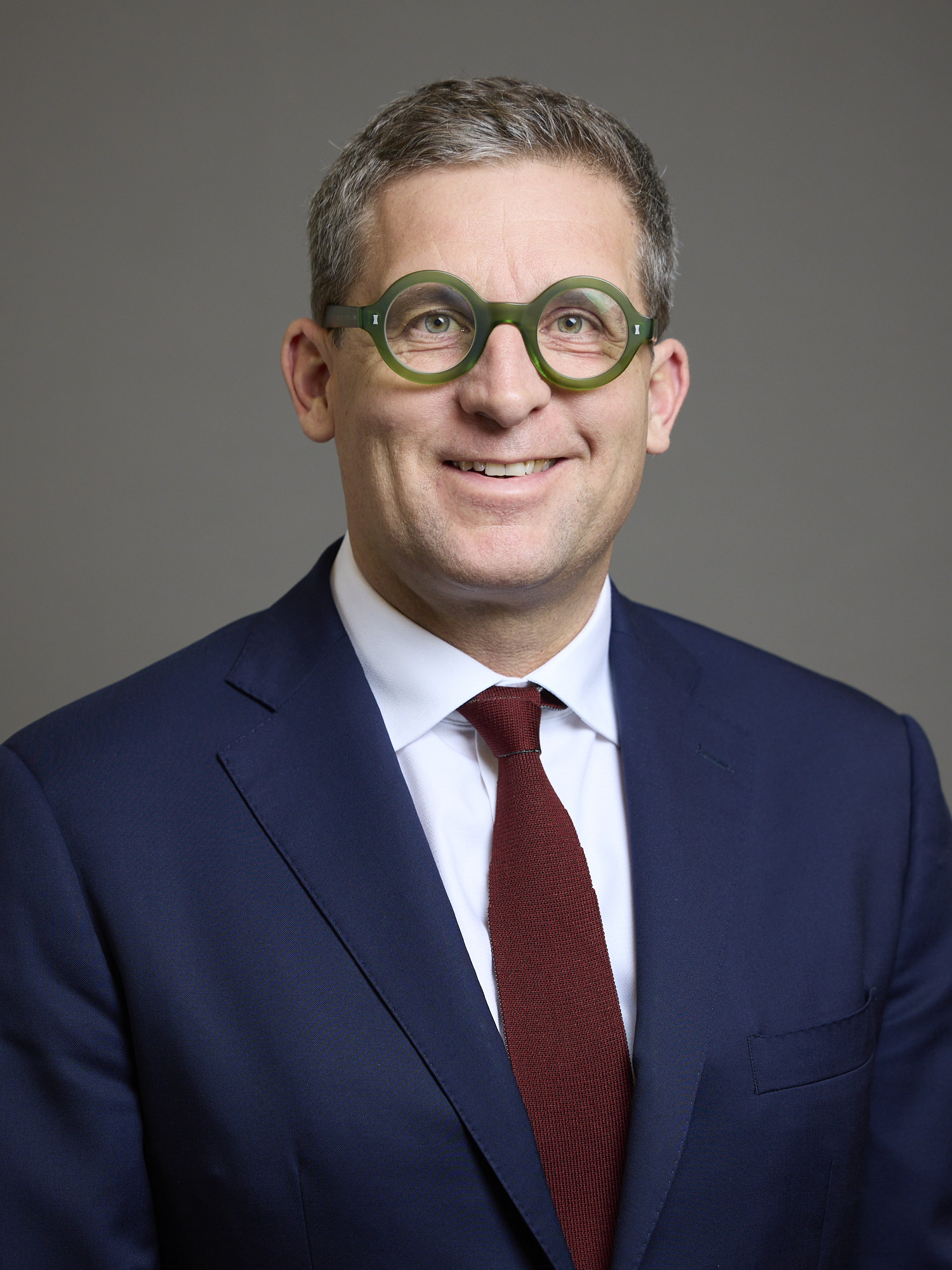
- Official portrait, 2024

Minister of State for Prisons, Probation and Reducing Reoffending
- In office 5 July 2024 – 20 July 2026
- Prime Minister: Keir Starmer
- Preceded by: Edward Argar
- Succeeded by: Catherine McKinnell

Member of the House of Lords
- Lord Temporal
- Life peerage 22 July 2024

Personal details
- Born: William James Timpson; 17 September 1971 (age 54) Knutsford, Cheshire, England
- Party: Labour
- Spouse: Roisin Brannigan (m. 1997)
- Relations: Edward Timpson (brother)
- Children: 3
- Parents: Sir John Timpson (father); Alex Timpson (mother)
- Education: Hatfield College, Durham (BA)

William James Timpson, Baron Timpson, OBE, DL (born 17 September 1971) is a British businessman and politician who served as Minister of State for Prisons, Probation and Reducing Reoffending from 2024 to 2026. He was the chief executive officer of the Timpson Group, owned by his father Sir John Timpson, from 2002 to July 2024.

== Career ==
Timpson was born in Knutsford, Cheshire, on 17 September 1971 to John and Alex Timpson. His younger brother Edward was a Conservative Member of Parliament (MP) for 14 years till 2024. Timpson attended Uppingham School and gained a Bachelor of Arts degree in geography from Durham University before joining his family business.

He was the chief executive officer of the Timpson Group, owned by his father Sir John Timpson, from 2002 to July 2024.

He was appointed Officer of the Order of the British Empire (OBE) in the 2011 Birthday Honours list for services to training and employment for disadvantaged people. Timpson was appointed as a deputy lieutenant (DL) of Cheshire on 11 October 2019.

Known for advocating the employment of former prisoners, he was the chair of the Employers Forum for Reducing Re-offending (EFFRR) until 2016, and became the chair of the Prison Reform Trust that same year. He also founded the Employment Advisory Board network across the prison estate, which links prisons with employers to improve the employment opportunities for ex-offenders upon release.

In November 2018, Timpson was selected by prime minister Theresa May to co-chair one of five new business councils to advise on how to create the best conditions for UK businesses after Brexit. He was the co-chair of the Small Business, Scale ups and Entrepreneurs Council, alongside Brent Hoberman and Emma Jones.

In March 2021, he was reappointed by prime minister Boris Johnson, as a trustee of Tate for a four-year period. In June 2022, he replaced Jonathon Porritt as Chancellor of Keele University.

Timpson wrote a column on business and leadership for The Sunday Times throughout 2021, and this inspired his book The Happy Index: Lessons in Upside-Down Management, which was published in February 2024 by HarperCollins.

In February 2024, Timpson made comments suggesting only a third of prisoners should be in prison.

In July 2024, Timpson was appointed Minister of State for Prisons, Parole and Probation in the Starmer ministry by Prime Minister Sir Keir Starmer following the Labour Party's victory in the 2024 general election. Because of this appointment, he stepped down as chief executive officer of Timpson and chair of the Prison Reform Trust. He was nominated for a life peerage and was created Baron Timpson, of Manley in the County of Cheshire, on 18 July. Timpson was introduced to the House of Lords on 22 July.

On 20 July 2026, Timpson resigned as prisons minister, ahead of Andy Burnham becoming prime minister.

== Personal life ==
Lord Timpson married Roisin Brannigan in 1997. They have two sons and a daughter.

Academic offices
Preceded by Jonathon Porritt	Chancellor of Keele University; 2022–2024	Vacant
Orders of precedence in the United Kingdom
Preceded by The Lord Vallance of Balham	Gentlemen; Baron Timpson	Followed by The Lord Hermer
