= Persil Service =

- Industry: Concession stores
- Founded: 2002; 24 years ago
- Defunct: May 2008; 18 years ago
- Fate: Acquired by Timpson Ltd
- Headquarters: United Kingdom
- Parent: Unilever Ventures

Persil Service was the trading name of Persil Services Ltd., which operated concession units within selected Sainsbury's stores in the United Kingdom. The company operated over 70 shops and employed staff who were trained to process photographs, prepare dry cleaning and laundry, cut house keys and to serve customers.

Persil Service was taken over by Timpson Ltd in May 2008 and all stores are now listed as "Timpson Ltd" branches, with gradual refits across the line bringing storefronts into the Timpson style.

== History ==
Persil Service began as a subsidiary of Unilever Ventures, part of Unilever, who hold a licence to use the Persil brand. It was initially trialed within eight Sainsbury's stores in Central London in 2002 and after a successful 12-month pilot scheme was implemented within another 34 stores in 2004. Unilever secured a "multi-million pound" deal with Uberior Equity Ltd. to finance the implementation of the new stores.

The venture was initially run in partnership with Persil (which provided the brand name), Sainsbury's (which provided the floorspace) and Kodak (which provided photo processing equipment). After the pilot scheme, the Kodak partnership was dropped and Fujifilm filled the gap.

== Services ==
=== Dry cleaning and laundry ===
Persil Service contracted large, industrial dry cleaning and laundry factories up and down the country to do the dry cleaning for a certain amount of shops within a certain radius. However, some stores (the so-called "production stores") processed dry cleaning and laundry on-site, allowing nearby shops to keep their customers' clothes within the company. Many of these production stores formerly traded as Sketchleys.

=== Photo processing ===
After Persil Service and Fujifilm teamed up, stores were outfitted with Fujifilm lab equipment. All stores contain a Fujifilm FP 363SC for fast processing of one-hour 35mm films rolls and a Fujifilm Digital Minilab Frontier 340, which allowed up to 900 customer photos to be processed per hour. The minilab was connected to a Fujifilm Smartpix digital terminal, located in the shop area which allows customers to print their own digital photos but at the same quality as other photos printed on a chemical printer.

=== Other services ===
Persil Service operated a key cutting service in most shops. The majority of these were for house keys only, but a small selection of shops had the equipment to craft copies of car keys.
The company piloted a shoe repair service in some branches in the north of England in the first half of 2006. The pilot scheme ended and the service was not adopted by the company. However, shoe repairs were taken in by shops and sent away for repairs by a partnered company.
A carpet cleaner hire service was available in most stores, in conjunction with Clantex Ltd. (previously Escort Elite).
An unsuccessful home delivery service was also piloted.

== See also ==
- Unilever
- Persil
- Fujifilm
- Sainsbury's
