= Clackers (disambiguation) =

Clackers were 1970s toys.

Clackers may also refer to:

- A term for editorial staff at the fictional fashion magazine in the novel The Devil Wears Prada
- A term for computer operators in the novel The Difference Engine
- Clackers cereal, a type of cereal made by General Mills
- Clapperboard, a device used in film production that "clacks" when identifying scene and take information
- A slang term for testicles

== See also ==
- Clack (disambiguation), for persons named Clack
- Clacker (disambiguation)
- Onomatopoeia
