= John H. Camp (Tennessee politician) =

American politician (1783–1829)

Speaker of the Tennessee House of Representatives
- In office 1827–1829
- Preceded by: William Brady
- Succeeded by: Ephraim H. Foster

Member of the Tennessee House of Representatives from the Giles County district
- In office 1825–1829
- Preceded by: John Clack
- Succeeded by: Thomas K. Gordon
- In office 1821–1823
- Preceded by: John Clack
- Succeeded by: John Clack

Personal details
- Born: John Hamlin Camp; January 27, 1783
- Died: November 10, 1829 (aged 46) Pulaski, Tennessee, U.S.
- Spouse: Dorothy Chamberlain Jones (m. 1808)
- Children: 2
- Education: University of Pennsylvania (MD)
- Occupation: Politician; medical doctor

John Hamlin Camp (January 27, 1783 – November 10, 1829) was an American politician and medical doctor from Tennessee.

== Early life ==
John Hamlin Camp was born on January 27, 1783, to Elizabeth (née Wall) and John Camp. His father was a captain of the 1st Virginia Regiment in the American Revolutionary War. The family moved from Virginia to the Davidson County, Tennessee. In 1804, he graduated with a Doctor of Medicine from the University of Pennsylvania School of Medicine.

== Career ==
In 1817, Camp and his family moved to Giles County. He was a medical doctor. He served in the Tennessee House of Representatives, representing Giles County, from 1821 to 1823 an from 1825 to 1829. He was appointed as the house's speaker pro tempore on November 12, 1821. He was speaker of the house in 1827.

== Personal life ==
Camp's father later married Martha Ward Jones, widow of Richard Jones. Camp married Dorothy Chamberlain Jones, the daughter of Richard Jones and Martha Ward Jones, on June 20, 1808. They had a daughter and son, Martha and John Wythe. He was an Episcopalian. He died on November 10, 1829, in Pulaski.
