= Clacker =

Clacker may refer to:

- Clacker, a character in The Dark Elf Trilogy
- a clapperboard, a device used in filmmaking
- M57 firing control for the Claymore mine
- a ratchet or cog rattle

== See also ==
- Clackers (disambiguation)
