= Ted Clack =

English footballer

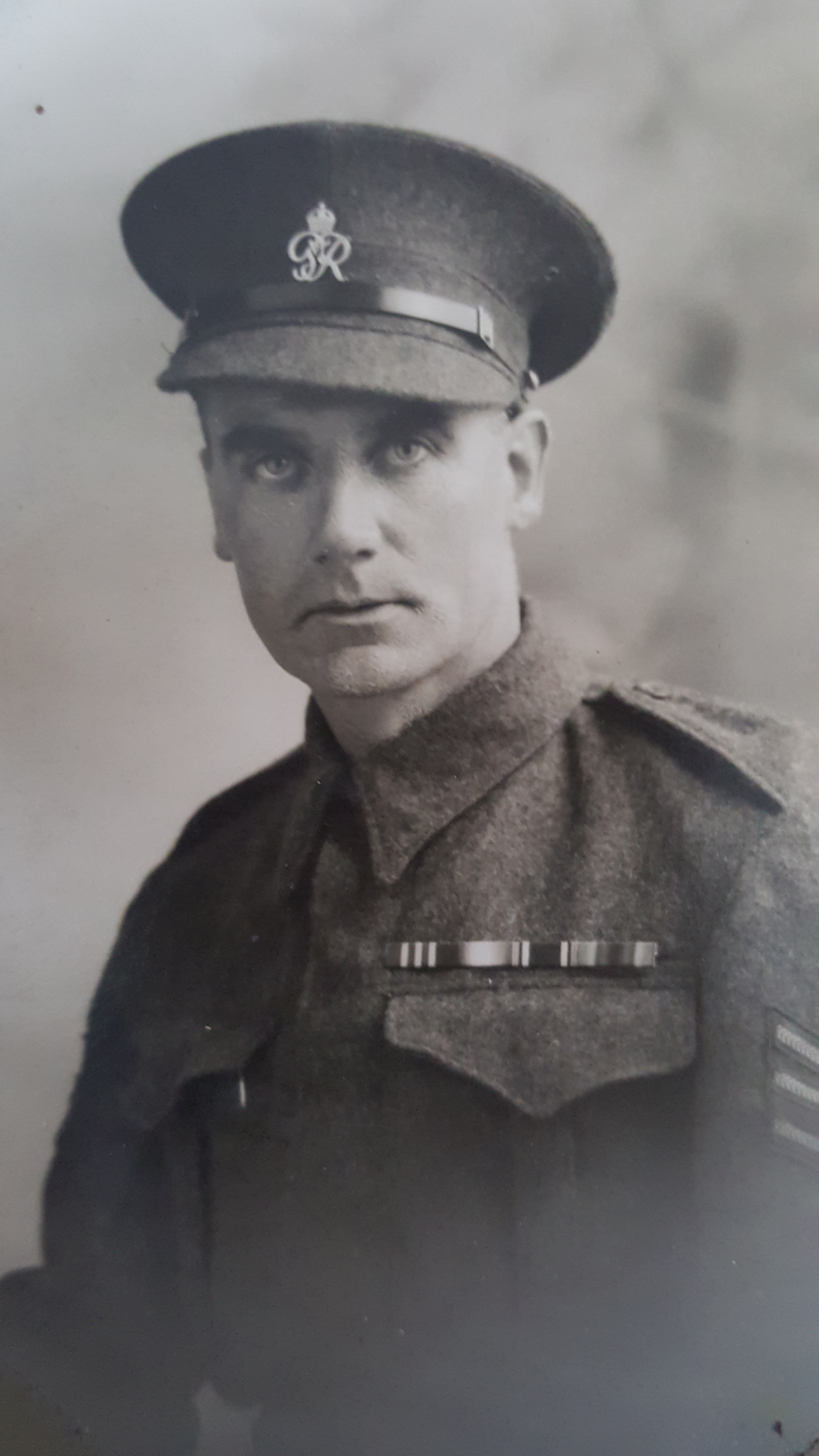
- Ted Clack in 1940 whilst serving with the British Expeditionary Force

Personal information
- Full name: Charles Edward Clack
- Date of birth: 4 June 1896
- Place of birth: Highworth, England
- Date of death: 11 April 1984 (aged 87)
- Place of death: Cirencester, England
- Height: 5 ft 9 in (1.75 m)
- Position: Winger

Senior career*
Years	Team	Apps	(Gls)
1920–1921	Pontypridd		
1921–1923	Sunderland	9	(0)
1923–1924	Bristol City	2	(0)
1924–1925	Nuneaton Town		
1925–1926	Hinckley United		
1926–19??	Holywell Amateurs		
- * Club domestic league appearances and goals

Charles Edward Clack (4 June 1896 – 11 April 1984) was an English professional footballer who played as a winger for Sunderland.

== Birth ==
Charles Edward Clack was born on 4 June 1896 in Highworth, Wiltshire. He was the son of Charles John Clack, a local labourer, and Maggie Butler. The eldest son of two, his parents died when he was fourteen, and he lived with his grandparents whilst working as a mat weaver. He began his football career at Highworth Town Football Club, and was part of the team which won the Swindon and District Junior Cup of 1912–1913.

== First World War ==
Ted joined up with the 5th Battalion Wiltshire Regiment in 1914, being deployed to Gallipoli in July 1915. On 10 August 1915, during the Ottoman assault on Chunuk Bair he and the rest of the 5th Battalion were driven off the hill. With four other soldiers he took refuge in a gully at Salzli Beit, where they hid for sixteen days until Lance Corporal Scott and Private Humphries were able to make their way back to friendly lines, and along with Captain Greany organize a search party to bring the wounded back. Ted convalesced back in England at Alder Hey hospital having suffered wounds to his left leg.

He soon returned to the front, this time with the 6th Battalion Wiltshire Regiment, posted to France. During the Battle of La Boiselle, part of the Somme campaign, he was wounded in the right thigh and returned to England for convalescence. By March the next year he was back in France, this time with the 1st Wiltshire Regiment. He took part in the Battle of Messines Ridge, and was awarded the Military Medal for his role as orderly, carrying messages backwards and forwards from an advanced position between 7 and 10 June, despite being half buried at one point by an exploding shell. He was promoted to Corporal during August 1917, but was once again wounded, this time in the right arm, later that same month. At this point he was transferred back to England, where he married his sweetheart Martha Hayes in December of that year.

He spent the rest of the war in England with the 3rd Wiltshire Regiment, taking the opportunity to reignite his love of football, playing in, and winning, the 1st Division Sittingbourne Section League in 1917, 1918 and 1919. Eventually promoted to Lance Sergeant, he was transferred to Z reserves and demobilized in March 1919.

== Between the wars ==
Post war, Ted continued his passion for football, playing for Pontypridd between 1920 and 1921, helping them to win a Welsh Cup medal, and then playing alongside Charles Buchan at Sunderland between 1921 and 1923, winning two Durham Cup medals and a Shipowners club medal, before moving to Bristol City for a season. He became a father twice, first to William Edward Clack in 1919 and then Norman Charles Clack in 1928.

== Second World War ==
On the outbreak of the Second World War in September 1939, Clack returned to service, joining the Military Provost Staff Corps at Aldershot in 1939 at the rank of Staff Sergeant. He deployed with the BEF to France in 1940, opening a Field Punishment Camp. As the BEF was pushed out of France, Ted evacuated with his compatriots at Dunkirk. He was then transferred to North Africa to open up a POW camp, but misfortune dogged him again and the troop ship that he was on, the Strathallan was torpedoed and sunk by U-562 on 21 December 1942. Clack survived the sinking, although he spent nine hours in the waters of the Mediterranean, and eventually continued on his way to North Africa and served there for six months before contracting dysentery. This, coupled with the exposure from his time in the sea, coupled with the wounds suffered in the last war, was enough for Ted to seek retirement from the forces, and he was discharged on grounds of disablement in July 1943.

The family connection with the forces would continue, with his sons both serving in the Royal Navy, William on board the surface fleet during and after the war, and Norman in the Royal Marines serving in Palestine and the Malayan Emergency.

== Post-war ==
Following his withdrawal from service, Ted worked as a store-keeper at Sketchleys for eighteen years but kept his interest in football alive, joining the Stratton Club and associating with the Hinckley Gunners team where he was not averse to joining them on the field, even in his sixties. He died on 11 April 1984 at his home in St. Clements Walk, Cirencester.
