= Snappy Snaps =

British photographic services franchise

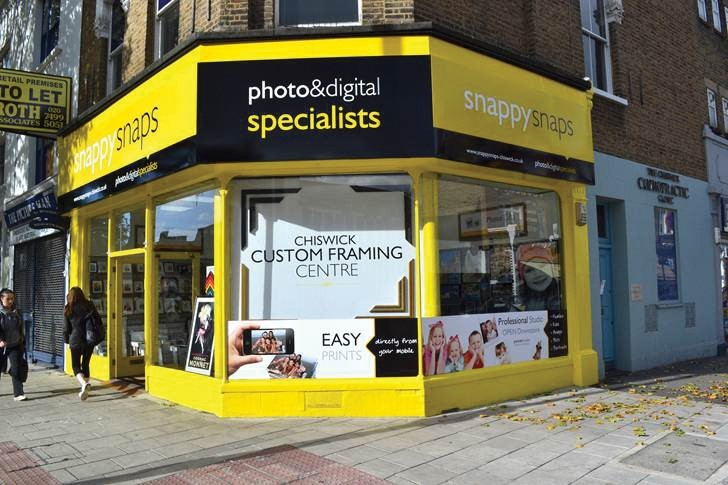
- Branch in Chiswick, London
- Company type: Private
- Industry: Retail
- Founded: 1983
- Founder: Don Kennedy and Tim MacAndrews
- Headquarters: London, UK
- Number of locations: 120
- Area served: UK
- Products: Photo prints and gifts
- Services: Photo printing and processing
- Parent: Timpson
- Website: snappysnaps.co.uk

Snappy Snaps is a British photographic services franchise that was founded in 1983 and joined the Timpson Group in 2013.

== History ==
As of March 2012 there were 120 Snappy Snaps franchise locations throughout the UK; As of December 2023, there are 115 franchise and 9 company-owned stores. Branches offer various services including one-hour film processing and digital photo printing.

The first Snappy Snaps one hour photo store opened in 1983. A further three trial stores were added during the following three years and, following the success of these stores, the first franchised Snappy Snaps store opened for business in 1987.

Snappy Snaps was also involved with the now abandoned UK identity card scheme.

The Snappy Snaps branch in Hampstead, London, featured in the news after the singer George Michael drove into the front of the building in the early hours of Sunday 4 July 2010 whilst under the influence of cannabis and prescription medication. Following Michael's death on Christmas Day 2016, the shop became the site of a "shrine" to the late singer, with fans leaving flowers, cards, messages and toys outside the shop front, much to the annoyance of the store management.
