= John Timpson (businessman) =

British businessman

Sir John Timpson CBE
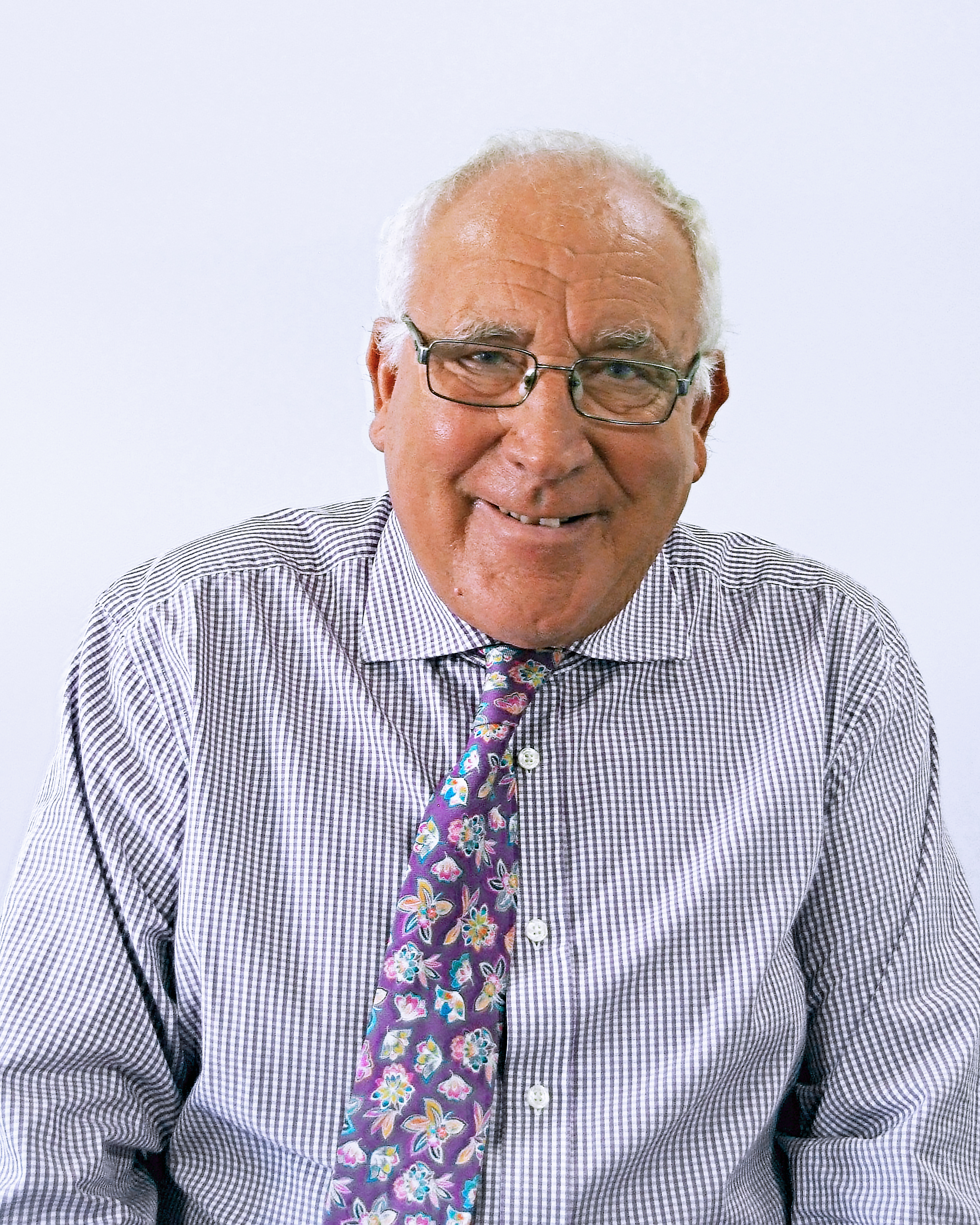
- Timpson in 2017
- Born: 24 March 1943 (age 83)
- Education: Oundle School
- Alma mater: University of Nottingham
- Occupations: Chairman and owner, Timpson
- Spouse: Alexandra Dodd (m. 1968; died 2016)
- Children: 5, including Edward and James
- Relatives: Kathleen Ollerenshaw (aunt)

Sir William John Anthony Timpson CBE (born 24 March 1943) is a British businessman who is chairman and owner of retailer Timpson.

== Early life and education ==
Timpson was born in 1943, and educated at Oundle School and the University of Nottingham, where he studied Industrial Economics from 1961 to 1964.

== Career ==
Timpson began his career as a management trainee at Clarks, before moving on to become a shoe buyer for his family's business, William Timpson Ltd., in 1965.

He was appointed a director of Timpson in 1968, and remained with the company after his father Anthony was ousted as chairman five years later, at which point it was acquired for £28,600,000 by United Drapery Stores. After leading a management buyout, Timpson was himself installed as the firm's chairman in 1985.

During the EU referendum in 2016, Timpson gave his public support for leaving the EU and stated that it is "a risk worth taking".

Timpson now has a weekly column in The Daily Telegraph and has written several books about his management style. He authored a series of mental health booklets based on his extensive experience of fostering, and on his policy of having recruited many people who have passed through the care and foster home system and the justice system.

According to the Sunday Times Rich List in 2025, Timpson's net worth was estimated to be £400 million.

In February 2026, Timpson was listed on the Sunday Times Tax list with an estimated £86.7 million.

== Personal life ==
Timpson lives in Cheshire. Together with his wife Alex, whom he married in 1968 and who died in 2016, he had three children, adopted two more, and fostered another 90. His son James Timpson was the chief executive of Timpson Group from 2002 to 2024. His youngest birth son, Edward Timpson, was the member of parliament for Eddisbury in Cheshire, and was previously MP for Crewe and Nantwich, also in Cheshire until 2024.

Timpson is an avid Manchester City supporter. He was appointed Commander of the Order of the British Empire (CBE) in the 2004 Birthday Honours for services to the retail sector, and was knighted in the 2017 Birthday Honours for services to business and fostering.

Timpson's aunt, Dame Kathleen Ollerenshaw, who died in 2014 aged 101, was a former Lord Mayor of Manchester, a Freeman of the City and a mathematician, and has been described as "one of the most distinguished Mancunians of her era".

== Publications ==
- High Street Heroes: The Story of British Retail in 50 People, Icon Books (2015)
- Ask John: Straight-talking, common sense from the front line of management; Paperback, Icon Books (2014)
- Upside Down Management, John Wiley & Sons (2010)
- How to Ride a Giraffe, Caspian Publishing (2008)
- Dear James: Secrets of Success from a Management Maverick, Caspian Publishing (2000)
