= H. Earl Clack Service Station =

- U.S. National Register of Historic Places
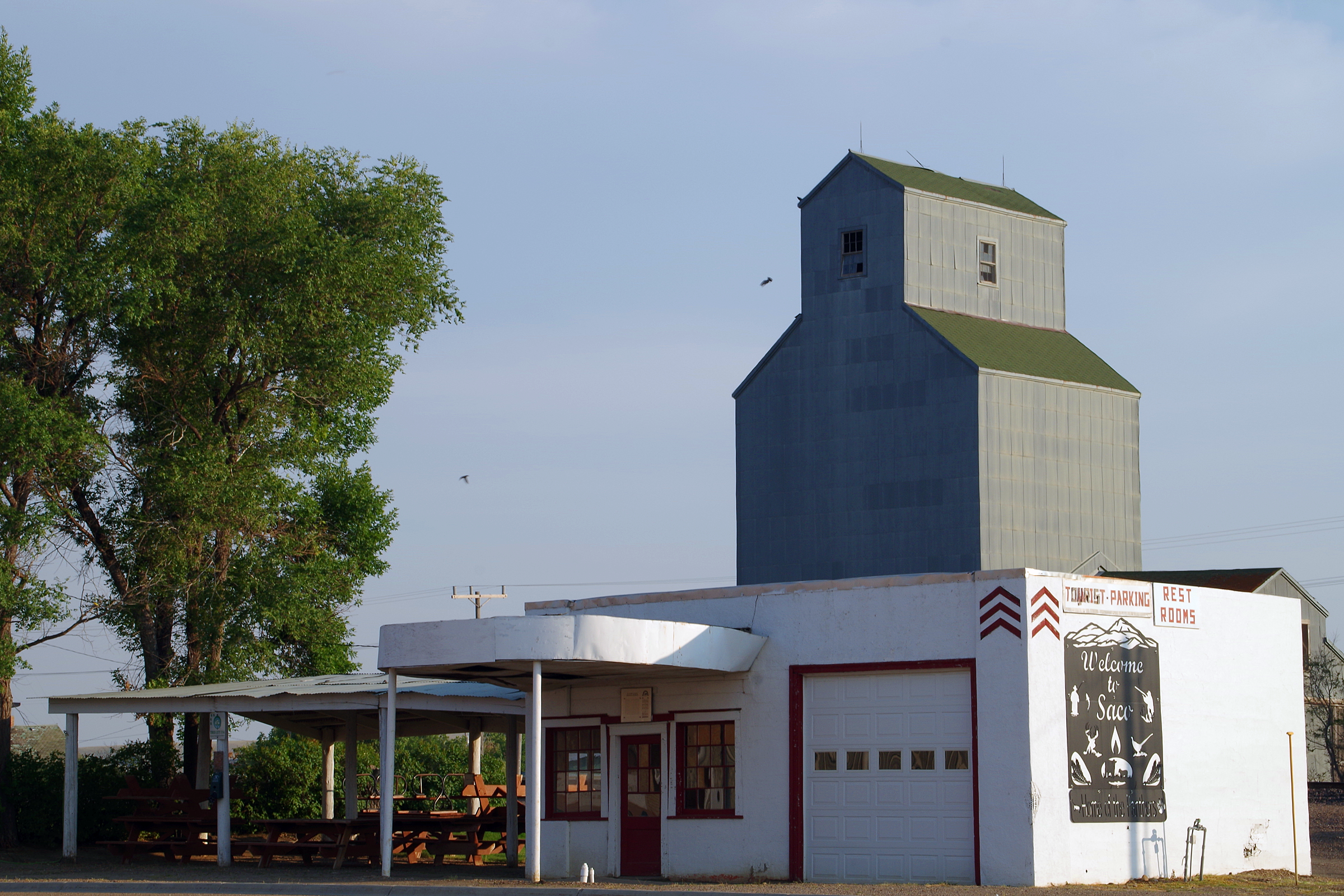

- Location within Montana Location within the United States
- Location: Southern side of U.S. Route 2, Saco, Montana
- Coordinates: 48°27′23″N 107°20′37″W
- Area: less than one acre
- Built: 1932
- Built by: Clack, H.E.
- Architectural style: Moderne
- MPS: Roadside Architecture Along US 2 in Montana MPS
- NRHP reference No.: 94000863
- Added to NRHP: August 16, 1994

H. Earl Clack Service Station in Saco, Montana, is a site on the National Register of Historic Places. The service station was added to the Register on August 16, 1994. It has also been known as Clack Station.

It was one of a number of gas stations in H. Earl Clack's chain of filling stations, and was probably built in the early 1930s. It was used as a gas station into the 1960s, and in 1994 served as restrooms for a park.

== See also ==
- H. Earl Clack House, NRHP-listed in Hill County, Montana
