= Lloyds Bank National Business Awards =

Discontinued British business awards

The Lloyds Bank National Business Awards were an annual British awards ceremony recognising achievement among businesses headquartered in the United Kingdom, held from 2002 to 2020. They comprised a programme of networking and judging events culminating in a black-tie dinner at the Grosvenor House Hotel in Mayfair, London. The awards once called "the Oscars of great British business" by former prime minister David Cameron, but were closed by owners Informa Markets after a change in direction by the information company post Covid pandemic.

In 2019 it featured over 140 finalists across fifteen categories, covering business innovation, growth, entrepreneurship, employment, data, artificial intelligence and corporate social responsibility. Among the winners were entrepreneurs James Timpson and Sara Davies. The 2020 ceremony was the final edition of the awards.

== Categories ==
It awards prizes in the following categories:

- The Lloyds Bank Exporter Award
- The Lloyds Bank Mid-Market Business Award
- The Lloyds Bank New Business Award
- The Lloyds Bank Small to Medium-Sized Business Award
- The Lloyds Bank Positive Social Impact Award
- The Castle Corporate Finance Scale-Up Business Award
- The Data Excellence Award
- The Give a Grad a Go Employer Award
- The Inflexion Entrepreneur of the Year Award
- The LDC Growth Through Innovation Award
- The Virgin Atlantic Customer Experience & Loyalty Award
- The Artificial Intelligence Award
- The Business Enabler of the Year Award
- The New Entrepreneur of the Year Award
- The Leader of the Year Award
