= Johnson Service Group =

Textile rental business based in the UK

- Type: Public company
- Traded as: LSE: JSG
- Industry: Textile rental
- Founded: 1817; 209 years ago
- Headquarters: Preston Brook, Cheshire, UK
- Key people: Jock Lennox (Chairman); Peter Egan (CEO)
- Revenue: ▲€535.4 million (2025)
- Operating income: ▲€58.8 million (2025)
- Net income: ▲€37.1 million (2025)
- Website: www.jsg.com

Johnson Service Group is a specialist textile rental and laundry services business based in Preston Brook, Cheshire. It provides workwear and hygiene services, as well as linen services to the hospitality and catering sectors. It is listed on the London Stock Exchange and is a constituent of the FTSE 250 Index.

== History ==
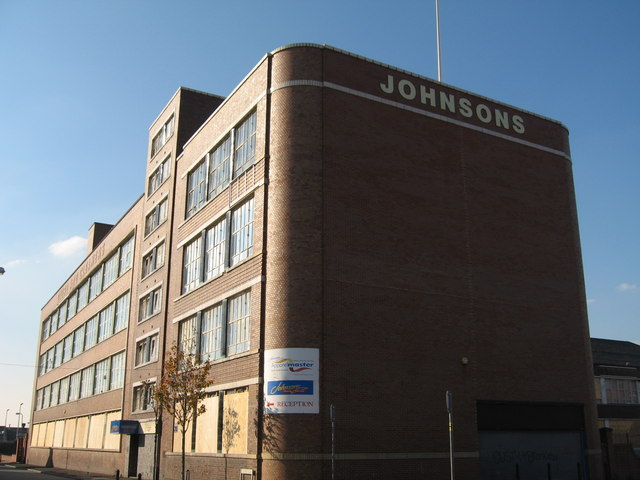
Former head office in Mildmay Road off Stanley Road in Bootle

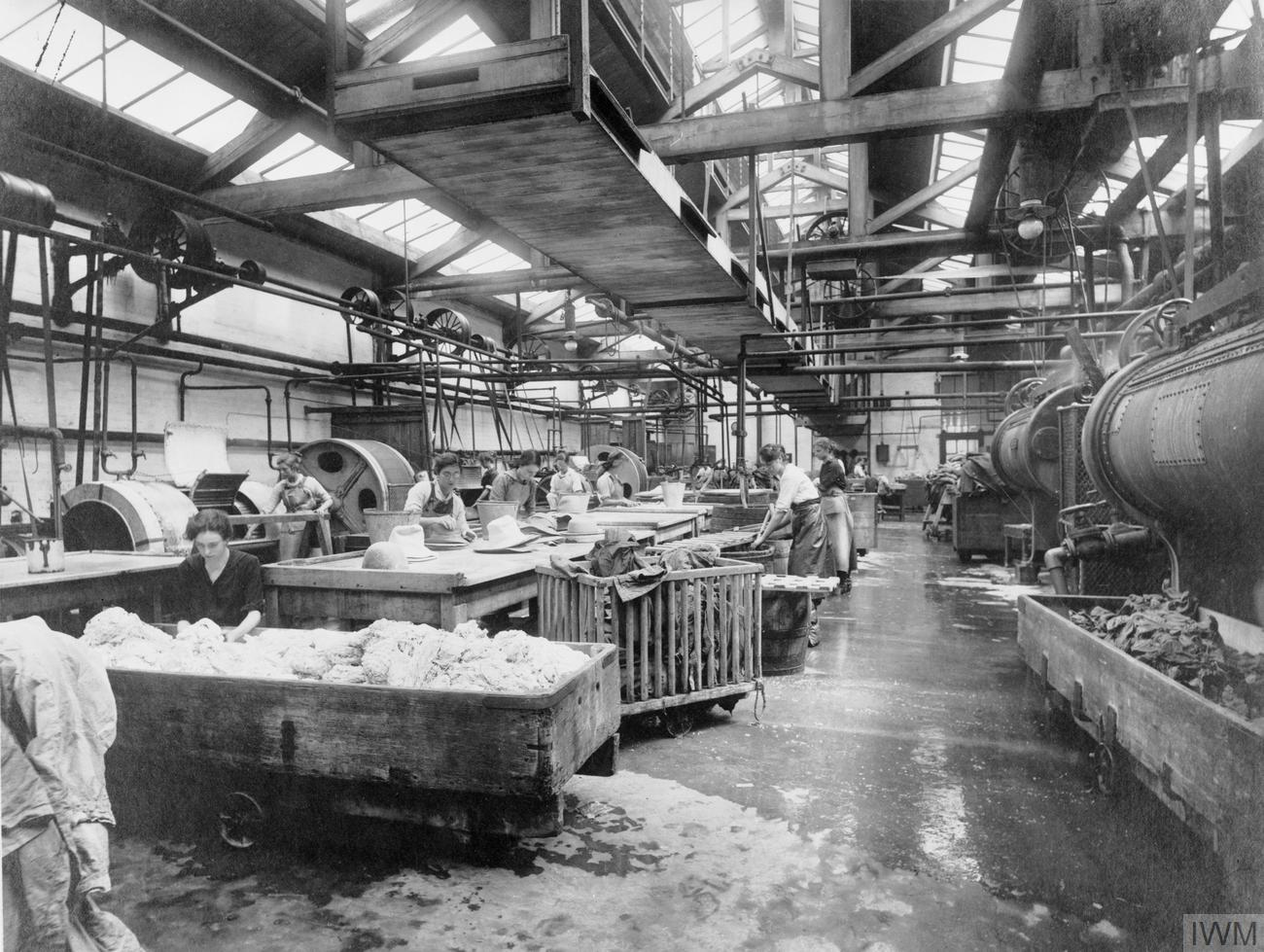
Workers in the wet cleaning department of Johnson Brothers' dye works at Bootle during World War I

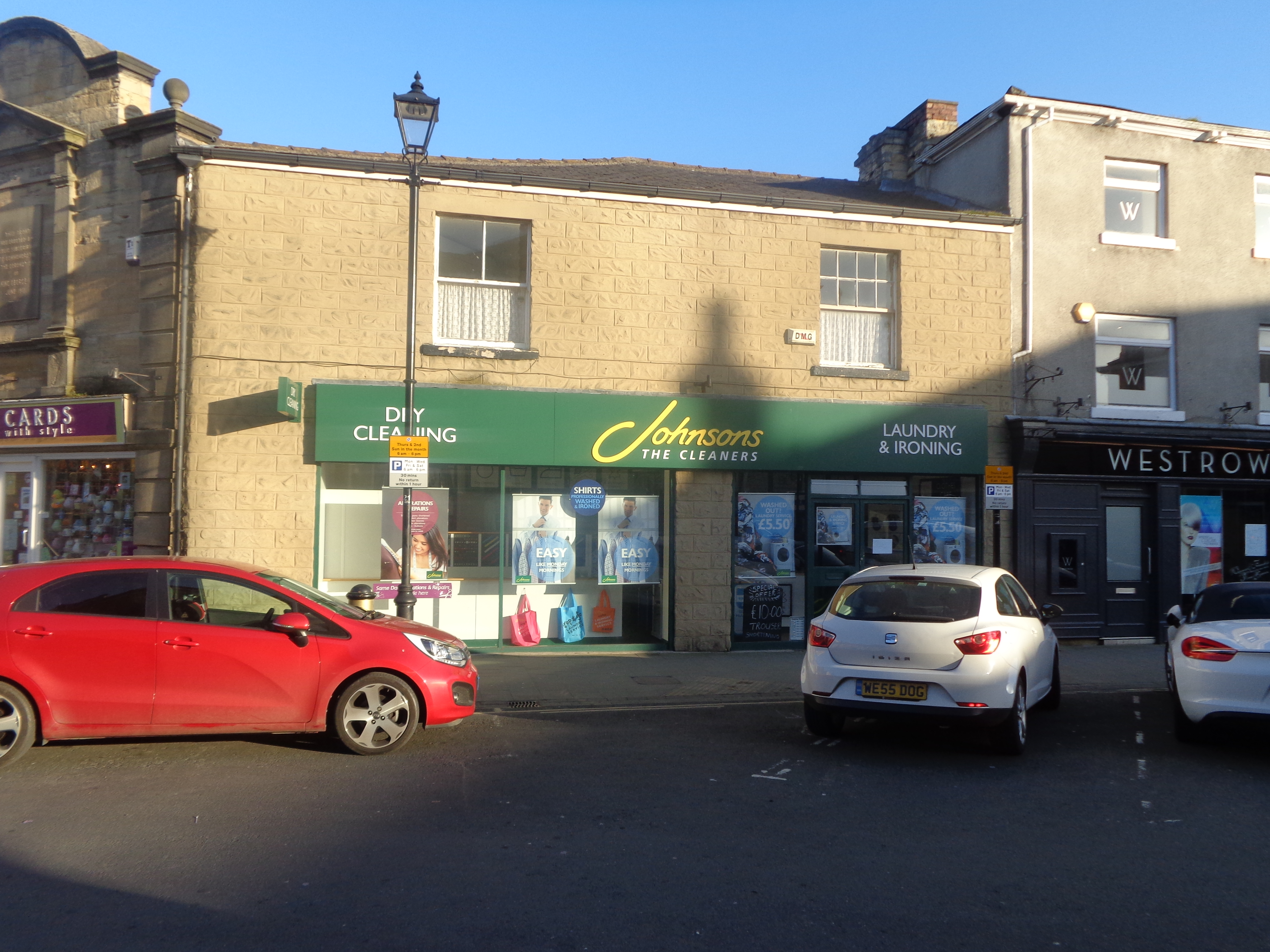
Johnsons The Cleaners, Wetherby, West Yorkshire (the dry cleaning business is now owned by Timpsons)

The business was established by William Johnson as a firm of silk dyers in Bold Street, Liverpool in 1817. Work started on a new head office at Mildmay Road off Stanley Road in Bootle under the direction of the then chairman, Benjamin Sands Johnson, in 1896.

In 1920, Johnson Brothers acquired two dry cleaning companies, Jas Smith & Son and Flinn & Son Ltd of Brighton and, through further expansion over the next sixty years, became the largest dry cleaning organisation in the UK. The company was renamed Johnson Group Cleaners in 1953. A major competitor, Sketchley, launched a series of hostile, but ultimately unsuccessful, takeover bids for Johnson Group Cleaners between 1977 and 1985.

After acquiring Stalbridge Linen Services in 1995, the twelve operating companies which made up Johnson Group Cleaners were restructured into just two businesses, Johnsons Cleaners and Johnsons Textile Services. The company was renamed Johnson Service Group in 1998.

Johnson Service Group acquired its competitor, the Sketchley Dry Cleaning business, comprising 103 branches, from the then-owners, Timpson, for £1 in May 2004. In July 2006, Johnson Service Group announced its intention to sell its dry cleaning business, including the Sketchley and Jeeves of Belgravia brands.

The company relocated from Bootle to Preston Brook in Cheshire in 2007 and was the subject of an initial public offering on the Alternative Investment Market in June 2008.

In January 2015, the company announced the closure of 109 of their 307 remaining branches; the reason given was that the 109 shops' leases had come to an end and it would not be viable to renew them. Then, in January 2017, Johnson Service Group sold the remaining 198 Johnson Cleaners stores, along with Jeeves of Belgravia and Jeeves International, to Timpson.

The company's listing was transferred from the Alternative Investment Market to the main market in August 2025.
