= Spencer Clack =

American politician (1740–1832)

Member of the Tennessee House of Representatives from the Sevier County district
- In office 1796–1803 Serving with Samuel Newell
- Preceded by: Position established
- Succeeded by: Thomas Buckingham

Personal details
- Born: March 28, 1740 Loudoun County, Colony of Virginia, British America
- Died: July 9, 1832 (aged 92) near Sevierville, Tennessee, U.S.
- Resting place: Forks of Little Pigeon Church Cemetery; Sevierville, Tennessee, U.S.
- Spouse: Mary Beavers (m. 1766)
- Children: 11
- Relatives: John Clack (brother); Spencer Clack (nephew)
- Occupation: Politician; military officer; militiaman

Spencer Clack (March 28, 1740 – July 9, 1832) was an American politician from Tennessee. A slave owner, he served in the Tennessee House of Representatives from 1796 to 1803.

== Early life ==
Spencer Clack was born on March 28, 1740, in Loudoun County, Virginia. His younger brother was John Clack.

== Career ==
Clack attained the rank of lieutenant in the Continental Army during the Revolutionary War. Following the war, he moved to Henry County, Virginia. He served in the militia of Henry County under captains James Cowden and William Ryan. On January 23, 1783, he was appointed first lieutenant of the militia.

Clack served in the 1796 Tennessee Constitutional Convention. He was the first representative of Sevier County to the Tennessee House of Representatives. He served in that body from 1796 to 1803. He owned slaves and had a large estate on the east bank of Pigeon River near the border to North Carolina. He also owned a mill. He was a member of the school board of Nancy Academy in Sevier County. He gave land for the Forks of Little Pigeon Church, a Baptist church in Sevierville. He served as the church's first clerk.

== Personal life ==
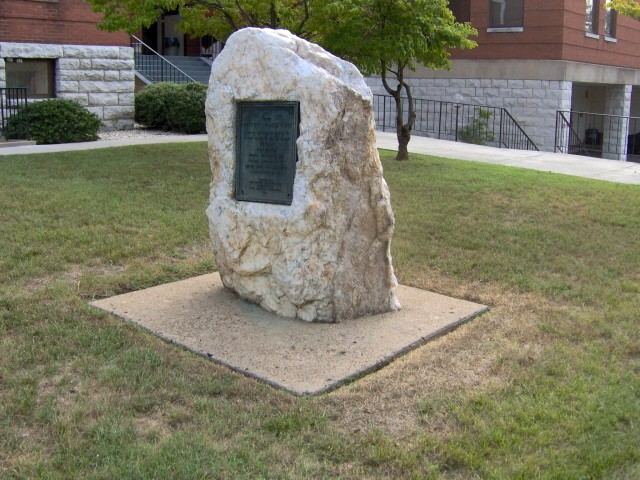
Plaque honoring Clack in Sevierville, Tennessee

Clack married Mary Beavers on November 2, 1766. They had 11 children: Raleigh "Rolly", John, Rhoda, Katherine, Mary, Malvina, Frances, Nancy, Rebecca, Mrs. Stone, and Spencer Jr. He was a Baptist. He was friends with John Sevier and according to his family, he advocated for the city of Sevierville to be named after Sevier. His brother John and nephew Spencer also served in the Tennessee legislature.

Clack died on July 9, 1832, near Sevierville. He was buried at the Forks of Little Pigeon Church Cemetery in Sevierville. The church later moved, but the old cemetery remains.
