= The Female American =

1767 anonymous novel

The Female American; or, The Adventures of Unca Eliza Winkfield
- 2001 edition
- Author: Anonymous (Unca Eliza Winkfield, pseud.)
- Cover artist: unknown
- Language: English
- Genre: Novel, Robinsonade
- Publisher: Broadview Literary Texts (Modern Reissue)
- Publication date: 1767 (Original), 2001 (Modern Reissue)
- Publication place: United Kingdom
- Media type: Print (Paperback)
- Pages: 196 pp (Paperback)
- ISBN: 1-55111-248-5 (Paperback)
- OCLC: 44019498

The Female American; or, The Adventures of Unca Eliza Winkfield is a novel, originally published in 1767, under the pseudonym of the main character/narrator, Unca Eliza Winkfield, and edited in recent editions by Michelle Burnham. The novel describes the adventures of a half-Native American, half-English woman, who is shipwrecked on an island. The protagonist uses her knowledge of Christianity to convert the indigenous inhabitants on the island as part of her survival mode.

This work belongs to the literary genre of the Robinsonade, in that – like other works of its era – it emulates Daniel Defoe's 1719 novel Robinson Crusoe. Although there are many similarities to Defoe's novel, the differences are what make The Female American distinctive. For instance, the narrator is not only a woman but is also biracial, as the daughter of a Native American princess and an English settler who resided in Virginia. The protagonist is also multilingual. Although Defoe's protagonist (Robinson Crusoe) chooses to leave his home and set out into an unexplored and dangerous life abroad, Winkfield's protagonist's (Unca Eliza Winkfield) trials and adventures are forced upon her. It is only in the latter part of the narrative that the female protagonist finds a living condition on the island that is more favorable than her American or European origins. In addition, the novel engages with the theme of finding one's home away from the native land, which can be identified in a range of fiction of 18th-century England. While Defoe's protagonist remains condescending towards the native people whom he encounters and easily deserts his companions for personal salvation, Winkfield's protagonist is compassionate and benevolent towards the indigenous community, embracing its practices. Similarly, the native people whom Unca Eliza discovers easily accept Christianity unlike Man Friday in Michael Tournier's modern revision of the Robinson Crusoe narrative, Friday.

Historical references to colonial America and eighteenth-century England, the fantasy of a feminist utopia, and the woman's role in colonialism and religious conversion are just a few of the components of this narrative. One of the criticisms that accompanied its publication in 1767 was that female readers might possibly partake in similar adventures, thus questioning their lives and limitations. The fear was that the virtue of the women of this period would be potentially endangered. In order to assuage such concerns, the introduction emphasizes that the story is not only "pleasing and instructive" but "fit to be perused by the youth of both sexes, as a rational, moral entertainment".

== Plot summary ==
=== Volume I ===
The poem opens with a declaration of the author's intention to relate the events of her life, which introduces the first major theme of female adventure outside of the domestic sphere. She describes her grandfather's plantation in Virginia, and the massacre of settlers by the American Indians, which leaves her grandfather dead and her father, Mr. William Winkfield, captured. As her father is about to be put to death by the Indians, a young Indian princess, named Unca, saves his life and secures his liberty by taking a liking to him and putting him in favor with the Indian king. Unfortunately, Mr. Winkfield's troubles mount when the young princess's sister grows equally fond of him and solicits him for marriage. He responds unfavorably, claiming love only for Unca, so she poisons him and leaves him for dead. Unca comes upon him and saves his life yet again, and they remove themselves from the village to live with the settlers. They are not there long before their daughter, Unca Eliza, is born, and they are visited by two Indian men sent from Alluca, Unca's jealous sister. The two men reveal daggers and a skirmish leaves Unca and one of the assassins dead, while Mr. Winkfield escapes death and takes the remaining assassin prisoner. Under the council of the other settlers, Mr. Winkfield decides to set the captive Indian free, sending him back to the village with a promise of revenge on Alluca from Mr. Winkfield. Alluca dies of grief before revenge can be had and sends her heart and a request for forgiveness to Mr. Winkfield.

Overcome with grief for his murdered wife, Mr. Winkfield decides to return to England with his daughter in order to take care of his sick brother. While there, Unca Eliza grows up in her cousins' company, is educated and exposed to Christianity, is baptized as a Christian, and notes with what great attention the English attend to her due to the complexion of her skin and her mixed Indian and English dress. Shortly after arriving in England, the grief-stricken Mr. Winkfield desires to return to Virginia, but intends for Unca Eliza to remain in England in order to finish her education. When she is eighteen years old, she is summoned by her father to return, and she makes the journey alongside her cousin, John Winkfield, who solicits her for marriage. She denies him, claiming that she will never marry a man who cannot use a bow and arrow any better than she can. Soon after arriving back in Virginia, Unca Eliza's father dies, and she is left alone. She desires to return to England when she is twenty-four, so she purchases a sloop and assembles a crew for the journey. On the way, her chosen captain solicits her for marriage to his son, but she refuses in the same manner as before. He is outraged by this, and threatens to leave her on an uninhabited island – securing all her money to him – if she does not reconsider. An altercation ensues, and the captain is thrown overboard by two slaves. (He is later recovered.) He gives Unca Eliza another opportunity to reconsider, but she does not, and he leaves her on an uninhabited island.

Once on the island, Unca Eliza, realizing that she is a castaway, grieves, then quickly devotes herself to God, realizing how lucky she is to be alive. Unca Eliza finds an abandoned hermitage shortly after, which she takes as her shelter. Inside, she finds a manuscript of the previous occupant telling her how to survive the manuscript's author has. The manuscript implies the occupant may soon be dead. Unca Eliza begins settling into her new lifestyle. She learns how to fend for herself and begrudgingly eats some goats and roots. After several weeks of this, she realizes the gravity of her situation and is much distressed, and comes down with a debilitating fever. Once she recovers, she consults the manuscript for more information, and learns that there is life on the island after all. She decides to explore her new habitation and understands the hermitage to be a religious temple of the sun, which contains numerous mummies. Upon returning from her explorations, she is startled by the presence of the hermit, whom she thought was no longer on the island. The hermit dies overnight, and Unca Eliza makes more explorations and discovers an underground passageway leading to an idol of worship. While she is there she discovers that she can climb inside "the oracle" and it allows her voice to be heard for a great distance. A tempest brews outside, trapping her in the passageway. Afterward, the temple is visited by a group of Indians, as the manuscript predicted, and Unca Eliza hides in the secret passageway. While she is in there, she resolves to convert the Indians to Christianity ("from their idolatry") and develops a plan to hide within the body of the idol and to speak to the Indians when they arrive for their worship on the following year. An earthquake ensues during her practicing of the plan, and upon its conclusion, she discovers it has destroyed her abode. When the Indians arrive for their worship, she converses with the high-priest from within the idol, instructing the Indians in Christian principles.

=== Volume II ===
==== Chapter I ====
By the end of Volume I, Unca has instructed the Indians to come back to visit her the following week for further instructions. She takes this time to reconsider what she had said to the Indians and how she should continue on with them. She also explored the island and discovered an extraordinary four footed animal. It was the size of a large dog, with long legs, a slender body, it had uncommonly large eyes which projected far from its head, and two rows of sharp but short teeth. This creature excited Unca's curiosity so she followed it. Other animals who were larger than it, fled at the sight of it. It came to a grassy area and extended itself as if dead, with eyes shut and lips closed. She sat down at some distance to watch it. The hair on his body was thick and long, five or six inches (152 mm), and formed bunches of clusters. A great number of field mice came up to him and began nibbling at the clusters of hair. It continued to lie still until a considerable number of mice had employed themselves among it. He then got up and shook violently, but the mice were stuck on him. He turned around, extended his long neck and began eating the mice greedily. In a few minutes he ate near three hundred of them because his body was almost covered in mice. Unca's curiosity was satisfied.

==== Chapter II ====
The day had come when the Indians were instructed to return to the island for further instructions. Unca took her place in the statue and waited. Only seven priest returned so she asked them why they did not bring their people? The high priest responded that it was their business to instruct their people after she has taught them. The priest explained that if she taught everyone, then they no longer had any means of employment. Unca told them that she will not teach them only and that they should not fear. She instructed the priest to go back and return with their people. He agreed and told her that they will return with their people in the morning because it will take up too much time in one day to complete this task. The next morning, the priest returned with a considerable number of people. She lectured for three hours and then told them to break for refreshments. She also instructed them to retire further from her so that she may emerge from the statue and take a refreshment for herself. She encouraged the people to ask her questions but they responded that "our priest know all, teach our priest and they will teach us". She concluded from this answer that the priest had instructed the people in private and then reminded everyone of what she had told them the previous day. Finishing her lecture, she told everyone that she had much more to teach them and that they should return once a week. The high priests being old should come if he pleased and all other could also choose to come if they wished. Unca excused the Indians and soon they all left the island.

==== Chapter III ====
Being suspicious of the priest because they would never suffer to be useless to their people, Unca decided that she must live among the Indians. Unca wished to make more progress with her teachings and it would be hard to do so from the statue once a week. It would also be inconvenient for them to come during the rainy season. She also considered her living arrangement. It would be hard for her to live underground during the summer and she would be confined to it also in the winter. After much thought she decided that it would be absolutely necessary to live with the Indians. She planned to introduce herself to the Indians but keep them ignorant of who she was and how she came to them so that she "might preserve a superiority over them". When the Indians returned to the island, she told them that they were ignorant of the true God and that God will send a holy woman to instruct them more fully. She told them to not be fearful or suspicious of that person who will be a woman. She will bring holy writings. They must respect her, do everything she commands, do not ask her where she comes from or when she is leaving, when she wishes to visit the island do not follow her or do anything that she forbids. Unca told them that she does not wish to force this woman upon them. They tell her to "Let her come! We will love and obey her!" She then instructed them to come back three days later, two hours after sunrise, and they will see the woman dressed like a high priest. After the Indians received her instructions and left, Unca began preparing for her departure.

==== Chapter IV ====
Unca rises early and begins preparing for the return of the Indians. She dresses herself in white and adorns herself in ornate jewelry of gold and precious stones. She leaves her shelter, locks it, and covers it up. Unca arrives at the statue and awaits the return of the Indians with her a staff, her bow and arrow, and a bundle of treasures. She also remembers to pray to God, that He might take away her fear and guide her on this grand task. The Indians arrive and the high-priest greets Unca respectfully. Unca announces her intentions: she will live with them for some time and instruct them on God's teachings, which she says will make them "happy for ever." Unca does not fail to mention a set of rules which include the following: they must obey her orders, learn her teachings, and never ask where she came from, or when she is leaving. At this, the high-priest responds with bows of acceptance and gratitude but follows with a proposal that surprises Unca. Since their previous king had died recently and left no heirs, he asks Unca to take her place as their queen. She thanks him for the offer but declines saying she will be only their "instructor." They all agree and Unca presents the high-priest and many of the people with rings from her treasures. A few of the Indians come forward and offer Unca some food and drink and Unca stands to say grace. This marks the beginning of her Christian teachings. She then mentions Jesus Christ and explains the Christian understanding that he is the son of God to whom they owe their thanks and praise.

==== Chapter V ====
Before embarking with the Indians, Unca prays to God. After the prayer, she sings a hymn in the Indian language to demonstrate the Christian ritual for the Indians. She leaves with the large group by canoe, and is welcomed in the Indian country where she is provided with lodging and 6 Indian servant girls. She is presented with gifts of liquor, dried meat, flowers, and fruit. Unca begins daily instruction for the priests on Scripture, and a weekly public instruction to spread the Christian faith. She reflects upon her surprise at the willingness and enthusiasm of the Indians to learn about Christianity. Unca also begins to translate her prayer books and the Bible from English into the Indian language. She admits that she is not happy living among the Indians, and that she knows she is perceived to be more than mortal and deliberately takes advantage of this. In her spare time, she shoots her bow and arrow, and revisits her old island. Two years pass living with the Indians, and Unca completes her translation of the Bible, the Catechism, and most of her Prayer Book. She is proud to have replaced the Indians religion of idolatry with Christianity.

==== Chapter VI ====
Returning on a regular trip to her island, Unca immediately perceives Europeans approaching the Idol. Concerned that they might try and enslave the Indians she ascends into the Oracle. Realizing that her cousin is among them she decides to speak to them through the Idol. Their discussion confirms that it is her cousin Winkfield and Unca assures him - via the Oracle's booming voice - that she is alive. She then asks them to sing a hymn her uncle wrote during which she sets up an Indian instrument to play through the Oracle's mouth and dresses herself in ceremonial robes. Unca sneaks up behind them and holds a sun staff in front of her face, slowly revealing herself, further terrifying the company in the process. While her cousin is relieved to see her alive, the rest of his company has been deeply disturbed by the loud speech of the Oracle, the music which Unca made it play, and her sudden appearance in luxurious robes. Unca tells her cousin that she will explain all these things in good time, but the company is so frightened by her that they are unable to speak.

==== Chapter VII ====
The company returns to their ship and Cousin Winkfield explains that the day after Unca was left on the island Captain Shore captured the vessel that she was on. The same Captain brought her cousin here to look for her, but now he is concerned the rest of the party has frightened the crew so much that she might not be able to get on board. Unca needs to leave for a while to settle things in her adopted home, but her cousin does not want her to leave at all. She insists and while she is waiting with her cousin and Captain Shore the crew members send a representative party to meet them. The party states that they are so terrified by Unca that they declare her to be the bride of Satan. Unca's cousin then agrees that she should return to her village and they make plans to meet on her island in the morning to set sail, which should give him time to calm down the crew.

==== Chapter VIII ====
As Unca leaves the sailors let out a shout for joy and she returns to the Idol to think about what has happened. She cries over her own folly and worries that her cousin might be murdered until she is exhausted and seeks some refreshment. Walking to her provisions she is immediately met by her cousin who tells her that they will not let him on board the ship. He assures her that Captain Shore will attempt to calm down his crew and will return in the morning to take them both on board. Unca and her cousin sit down to eat and he relates the fantastical claim of the crew: that they had seen her fly, filling the air with the smell of brimstone. Captain Shore challenged their claims saying that they are mutineers, but the crew insists that they are not, they just refuse to have the She-Devil or her friends on board. Unca and Winkfield decide to return to the island in the morning to see what Captain Shore has accomplished with his crew.

==== Chapter IX ====
Unca meets up with her canoe and tells the Indians - who had never seen a white man - that he is a relation of hers, which satisfies them. As they return to her village Unca tells her story to her cousin, who wishes to join her on her Christian mission. She discourages him and he proposes to her, which she delays answering as they have arrived on shore. They dine with the priests and return to her island in the morning. They spend most of the day on the island and are about to give up hope of seeing the ship when they find a note that Captain Shore has left for them. In it he states that the crew is resolute in their foolishness and the best he can do is leave Winkfield's effects on the shore and return for him with a new crew. This will take a year at least, but he will tell his family that both he and his cousin are alive, and when he returns he will leave them a means to signal his ship. Winkfield is happy because he can renew his suit of Unca, who only loves him as a friend and relation. She does consider that marriage would give them the chance to be alone together, as being alone with a man she is not married to hurts her modesty.

==== Chapter X ====
Winkfield's effects are taken to the village including some clothes for Unca for which she is very grateful. They also introduce chickens to the island along with a gun, telescope, and other goods, the result of which is to make the Indians as impressed with him as they are with Unca. Winkfield and Unca observe the sabbath and preach in English and the native dialect until Winkfield is fluent in the native language. Unca becomes so impressed with Winkfield that they are married within two months of his arrival and have both church and Indian ceremonies. The Indians are now baptized, married, and are "admitted to the Lord's supper." At this point Unca asks her husband Winkfield how his arrival came about. Winkfield recounts how Captain Shore sought out audience with his father and related the story of her abandonment. Captain Shore tells them that he became a pirate out of need, but vowed not to kill anyone, and made his crew promise the same. They were about to simply rob Unca's ship when they saw her Indian servant hanging from the yard-arm and demanded that the captain explain himself. The Indian is taken down and he tells Shore the entire story of the captain's treachery and Unca's abandonment on the island.

==== Chapter XI ====
Shore continues to recount his story saying that he found Unca's effects on board the ship, but is resolved to make the captain confess. Shore threatens to hang the captain at the yard-arm upon which the captain immediately admits to everything. Shore is about to hang the captain when he has a religious epiphany and repents, resolving to change his ways, repair his past, and bring the captain to proper justice in England. The captain is restrained and Unca's wounded servants are attended to; the male servant dies within a few days, but the two female servants survive. Shore then tells his crew that he hopes to lead them to repent just as he led them to sin and they all agree not to be pirates anymore. He hopes that Winkfield Sr. will help them procure a pardon so that they may turn in the captain and start their lives anew. He also pledges that whoever can prove that he robbed them will have their stolen effects returned. Shore then asks if Winkfield Sr. will accept this proposal, if he will not, then Captain Shore will leave them unharmed. They agree to the plan and give Shore passage to France so that he may await his pardon in safety.

==== Chapter XII ====
Winkfield continues to relate the story to Unca, stating that they received the conditional pardon for Shore and brought the captain and his crew to justice. While Shore was preparing to return to his crew he spent a great deal of time with cousin Winkfield who had hoped to find the island where Unca was abandoned in the hopes of bringing her home or properly mourning her. Winkfield is given permission by his family to search for Unca and Captain Shore is glad to take him to the island he suspects Unca to be upon. Winkfield has thus filled in Unca on all that had happened between her abandonment and her discovery. Their life continues on the island with Winkfield returning to Unca's island every two weeks until he finds a cannon with which to signal Captain Shore's ship. Captain Shore then spends three days in their village, further updating them on events in England. The treacherous captain was brought to trial and hanged along with three of his crew-mates. Captain Shore delivered the pardon to his crew and spent time returning stolen goods to their original owners. Unca and Winkfield then tell Shore what they have been doing and Shore asks to join their village, which they consent to. They then return to Unca's island to collect the gold to pay for their needed purchases and destroy the Idol to prevent the Indians from worshiping it ever again. Winkfield and Shore then return to England to get the family's blessing and to bring back books and other needed items. Shore and Winkfield return to the island and Unca sends back her manuscript whose final passage states that none of them have any intention of returning to Europe ever again.

== Major themes ==
=== Female authority ===
Female authority is a major theme in The Female American. This is evident from the outset of the novel, beginning with the great power and political influence of the young princess in the Indian tribe. Also, despite the fact that the book follows the Robinsonade genre conventions, it explores the possibility of a female adventurer rather than a typically male one. Unca Eliza is a powerful and independent heroine who commands respect outside of the normal domestic setting. For instance, she displays her dominance in her numerous denials for marriage. In response to her cousin's persistent proposals, she contends:

"I would never marry any man who could not use a bow and arrow as well as I could; but as he still continued his suit, I always laughed at him, and answered in the Indian language, of which he was entirely ignorant; and so by degrees wearied him into silence on that head" (51).

This also exemplifies Unca Eliza's superior worldliness, and her ability to compete on an equal level with her male counterparts. What complicates this theme is that Unca Eliza, though solitary on the deserted island, is aided in survival by the experiences and manuscript of a male character. However, it is ultimately Unca Eliza's decision to trust in God, and the ingenuity of her endeavor to convert the Indians to Christianity, that provide her with a successful way off the island.

However, even with this authority, Unca Eliza, does conform, at the end of the novel, to what is expected of her. She marries. Even when her cousin has not accomplished the task of mastering the bow and arrow. It seems this event is the author's attempt of satisfying the readers of the day. They would expect the woman to marry because isn't that what every 18th century woman strives for? For Unca Eliza the marriage serves more as a way to have companionship. She does not lose her independence and works beside her husband instead of under him. This may not be considered authority but equality.

=== Performance and gender roles ===
When Unca decides to convert the Indians to Christianity the use of performance is important to note because the reader can visually see how Unca uses the body of a male cleric to promote her ability as a female missionary, a role usually designated to men. Before Unca’s performance, she describes the sun idol saying that, “The image itself, of gold, greatly exceeded human size: it resembled a man clad in a long rob or vest” (Winkfield 86). Kristianne Vaccaro is surely right in reference to this part when she says “what is most significant about the text’s—and, ultimately, about Unca’s—performance of these religious “truths” is that she herself cannot access them without first playing the role of male cleric” (Vaccaro 136). Unca uses the body of the sun idol to instill religious truths because she herself would not be able to do so as a female. Once the performance begins, the reader can clearly see how Unca has used the body of the sun idol to perform her duty as a female missionary. She narrates that “High-Priest. Did God send you to teach us? Answer. He brought me hear, and I will teach you.” (Winkfield 104). Unca has successfully convinced the Indians of her religious truths and has used the sun idol to her aid in establishing her authority not only over the Indians but the reader as well. Unca no longer refers to herself as Unca but “Answer” signaling that the reader can now take all that she says for truth because she has successfully transformed into her role as a female missionary. This performance was necessary because Unca could not assert her authority without first performing a role she was not physically in reality; the role of a male cleric. Unca’s performance allows her to move through genders fluidly and assert her authority as a female missionary to both the Indians and the reader.

While this performance does help Unca to establish authority in this instance, the loss of Unca's voice towards the end of her narrative complicates her position as both a female authority figure and missionary. The Female American is no longer in the voice of Unca but “we” as she succumbs to marrying her white European cousin, they narrate “ As we never intended to have any more to do with Europe, captain Shore and my husband ordered the ship, by whom, for my father and mother’s satisfaction, I sent over these adventures” (Winkfield 162). Unca has become a “we”, much different from her previous position as the “Answer” showing that once her cousin came back, societal gender roles were put back into play and it did not matter what Unca did to try and assert herself. She even changes her “history” into “adventures” because it is no longer a history about her life but her helping her husband, the missionary, in this new world. Unca may seem to be a trailblazer at the beginning of her narrative but only exposes herself to be a pawn used to “keep intact the social hierarchies from which [she] arises” (Vaccaro 150).

=== Imperialism and religious conversion ===
Unca's faith in God and her desire to convert the Indians to Christianity prompt her to speak forth from the Idol as a type of "Queen" or female "God." This raises the issue of capitalist accumulation, colonial conquest, and political imperialism which many theorists have associated with Defoe's novel, Robinson Crusoe. There are several situations and events in the novel which portray Unca's relation to this theory. After Unca first speaks to the Indians through the masking of the Idol, she is uncertain whether she had done an evil act. Although she does affirm that Idol Worship is contrary to Christian doctrine, but she bravely used this same idol to dispel a belief in false gods. Then speaking through this idol, she revealed her true intent, and through her diligence, she converts the natives to Christianity.

"I heartily repented that I had ever spoken to them... Thus I was distracted whether I determined to stay, or go; to stay was attended with certain evils; to go, too probably, with very great ones. Miserable wretch! cried I, what shall I do? tears succeeded; and I could think no more, with any coherence" (110).

While she is unsure of the morality of her decision to speak to them as a God, she still goes on to enforce her superiority over them:

"[B]y keeping them ignorant of who I was, or how I came to them, I might preserve a superiority over them, sufficient to keep them in awe, and to excite their obedience: yet I determined to speak no untruth" (110).

Unca's desire to "preserve a superiority over them" comes from an even deeper fear and an increased desire for protection and safety. To her, God is a powerful force, but in a moment of despair, He is not her savior. Unca turns to a statue, a false idol, to protect her from the unknown and in an attempt to preserve her life, she readily embraces this newfound "superiority" and power over the Indians.

She does however, retain her dignity by remaining truthful throughout her conversations with the Indians. The fact that she had slaves who "begged" to go with her on her travels is yet another incident which can be seen as Capitalist Accumulation. And relating her strategies with those of Robinson Crusoe's, hers seem more manipulative than severe. She does have two weapons: a knife and a bow and arrow. However, she only uses them (the knife) when absolutely necessary.

Early in the novel there is another scene that discusses imperialism. In this scene, Unca's father is reflecting on a conversation he once had with his elder brother, who was a clergyman. His brother clearly disagrees with imperialism and tries to dissuade Unca's father from invading other countries:

"We have no right to invade the country of another, and I fear invaders will always meet a curse; but as your youth disenables you from viewing this expedition in that equitable light that it ought to be looked on, may your sufferings be portionably light! for our God is just, and will weigh our actions in a just scale" (37).

Even though Unca's father had this dramatic warning from his brother, he still goes on to try and conquer foreign countries. His brother even tries to infuse guilt into his speech, but it still does not register with Unca's father. Unca's father's attitude is clearly reflected in Unca when she uses the idol statue to convert the Indians.

== Historical relevance ==
Unca Eliza Winkfield's grandfather is said to be Edward Wingfield, the first president of the Virginia colony. Winkfield was dismissed as president when the Colony of Virginia fell under a harsh food shortage, which in turn caused many internal political disputes about Winkfield's ability to successfully govern Virginia. His immediate predecessors were John Ratcliffe and then the famous John Smith. After being expunged from his presidential duties, Edward Winkfield wrote a famous text by the name of "Discourse on Virginia". In this text he speaks of his true passions, his resentment of being asked to leave, future plans that he had for Virginia, outlooks on Virginian society in general, and the faults of Virginia that could possibly lead to its demise.

== See also ==
- Robinson Crusoe
- Robinsonade
