= Jerry Clack =

American classical scholar (1926–2019)

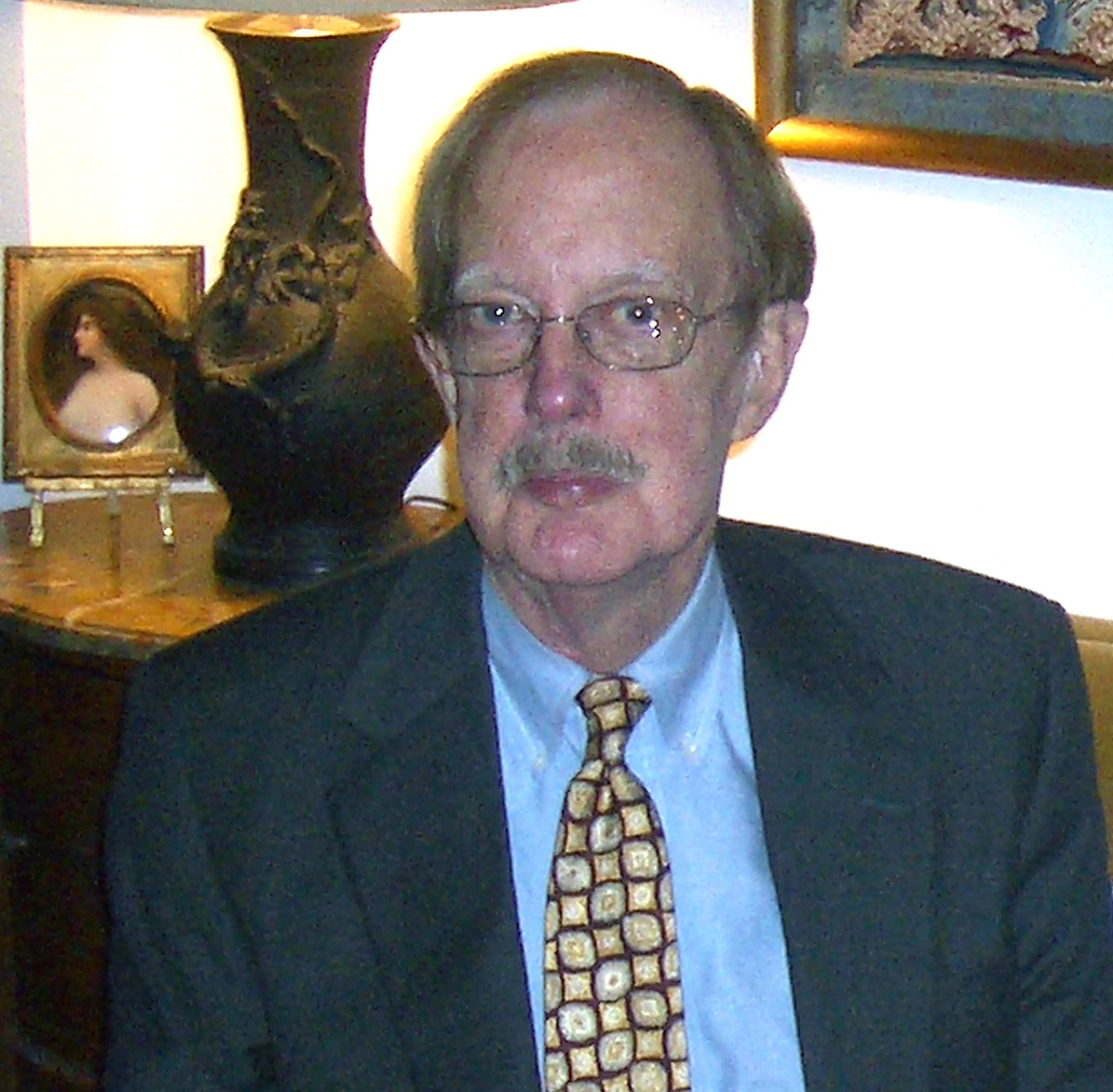
- Born: July 22, 1926; New York City, U.S.
- Died: April 15, 2019 (aged 92); Pittsburgh, Pennsylvania, U.S.
- Education: Princeton University ('46); University of Pittsburgh ('58, '62); Duquesne University ('77)
- Occupation: University professor

Jerry Clack (July 22, 1926 – April 15, 2019) was an American scholar who was professor of classical languages at Duquesne University in Pittsburgh. He was also a political activist, public relations executive, and was involved in activities of the Opera Theater of Pittsburgh and Citizens for Global Solutions. Clack died in April 2019 at the age of 92.

== Early life ==
The son of Mildred Taylor Van Dyke of Pittsburgh, Pennsylvania, United States, and Christopher Thrower Clack of Boydton, Virginia, Clack was born in New York City on July 22, 1926. Insofar as his father was a foreign representative of the Blaw Knox Company, a Pittsburgh firm, he spent the earliest years of his life first in London and then in Düsseldorf. It was there that his father died in 1931. Returning with his mother to Pittsburgh he attended Fulton School, and Peabody High School in the early 1940s. He was accepted into Princeton University in the fall of 1943 as a member of the class of 1947, but was graduated from the university in the spring of 1946.

== Professional career ==
=== Politics and public relations ===
After a brief stint in the late 1940s at the Swedish Legation in Washington D.C., Clack joined the staff of the United States National Commission for the UNESCO. His four-year (1947–1951) participation in the work of UNESCO whetted an interest in international organizations which has remained with him throughout his life. His belief in the United Nations is best expressed by Archibald MacLeish's ringing phrase which graces the preamble to the UNESCO constitution. It is "a bridge of dreams over the chasms of despair."

His responsibilities with the organization included those of documents officer for the United States delegation and the UNESCO general conferences in Florence in 1950 and Paris in 1951 and of program officer for the ongoing operation of the commission in Washington, D.C.

Returning to Pittsburgh in 1952, Clack entered the public relations field and served as an account executive for the Pittsburgh offices of such well-known organizations as the American Automobile Association, the Coca-Cola Company, the American Heart Association and the March of Dimes.

It was the March of Dimes (known then as the National Foundation for Infantile Paralysis) which attracted him during his middle years, years of the raging polio epidemics which claimed thousands of victims annually. Clack assumed the directorship of the Allegheny County Chapter of the March of Dimes in 1953. The fifteen years of his tenure saw the development of two anti-polio vaccines: that of Jonas Salk at the University of Pittsburgh and the oral vaccine of Ohioan Albert Sabin. In addition to his responsibility for patient care and fundraising, Clack took an active part in the mass immunization programs which were launched by the AMA and which proved the efficacy of the Salk vaccine. Later, he was key in the transformation of the National Foundation into an agency devoted to the study and prevention of birth defects, a pursuit which remains the thrust of its programs even today. Moreover, he was active in seeking funding for the Salk Institute at La Jolla, California.

=== Academic career ===
Having received an undergraduate degree in classics from Princeton in 1946, Clack, during his tenure with the March of Dimes, pursued an M.A. (1958) and a Ph.D. in classics at the University of Pittsburgh, receiving the latter degree in 1962. Although at the time he had no intention of pursuing a career in Classics, in 1968 he was offered a position in the department of classics at Duquesne University and decided to turn his lifelong hobby into his profession, often reminding his colleagues that he had brought the modern business world to the Romans and Greeks.

Clack has distinguished himself as an activist for his profession. For a number of years he has served as chairman of the American Philological Association's Committee of Editors of Classical Journals and of its Committee for Regional Classical Organizations. He has devoted the greater portion of his time to the Classical Association of the Atlantic States. He served CAAS at every level: as president in 1978-1979, as executive director from 1993–2001 and later as archivist. Moreover, he served as editor of the association's journal (The Classical World) for 15 years. CAAS has established an annual lectureship in his name.

At Duquesne University, he served as chairman of the department of classics from 1973 to 1975 and again from 1980 to 1983 and has been active in university affairs, including service on the University Core Curriculum Committee, the Student Standing Committee, the Committee on Promotion and Tenure, and the Library Committee; in addition, he was a member of the editorial board of the Duquesne University Press for a time. He retired from Duquesne in December, 2011 at age 85.

Clack has published in his field, with particular interest in the Hellenistic age. In addition to journal articles, he has produced four textbooks devoted to Hellenistic poetry and epigrams: An Anthology of Alexandrian Poetry (1982); Meleager: The Poems (1992); Asclepiades of Samos and Leonidas of Tarentum: The Poems (1999); and Antipater of Sidon and Dioscorides: The Poems (2001).

=== Community involvement ===
In the Pittsburgh community he is a member and former officer of Citizens for Global Solutions (formerly the World Federalist Association of Pittsburgh), a worldwide organization which seeks to strengthen the influence and effectiveness of the United Nations—an extension of his belief that world peace and security can be achieved only by international cooperation. In November 2010, he was presented with the Norman Cousins Award by CGS for his fifty years of service in support of the programs and activities of the United Nations. He was also treasurer and is currently chairman of the board of Opera Theater of Pittsburgh, whose goal is to bring the city interesting alternatives to the standard opera repertory with up-and-coming young singers and to encourage the production of American operas. In 2017 he was awarded OPERA America's National Opera Trustee Recognition Award

== Education ==
- Princeton University - B.A. in Classics, 1946
- University of Pittsburgh - M.A. in Classics, 1958 (Thesis topic: The Literary Tradition of the Georgics Before 1600)
- University of Pittsburgh - Ph.D. in Classics, 1962 (Dissertation topic: The Chrysis of Aeneas Silvius Piccolomini)
- Duquesne University - M.A. in Spanish Language and Literature, 1977
