= Alex Timpson =

British children's campaigner (1946–2016)

Alex Timpson MBE
- Born: Alexandra Winkfield Dodd; 25 April 1946
- Died: 5 January 2016 (aged 69)
- Spouse: John Timpson (m. 1968)
- Children: 5, including Edward and James

Alexandra Winkfield Timpson MBE (née Dodd; 25 April 1946 – 5 January 2016) was a British campaigner for children's rights.

She grew up in Lymm, Cheshire. Together with her husband John Timpson, she had three children (including politicians Edward Timpson and James Timpson, Baron Timpson), adopted two more, and fostered at least ninety other children.

In the 2006 New Year Honours, she was appointed a Member of the Order of the British Empire (MBE) "for services to Children and Families".
