= John Clack =

American politician (1757–1833)

Member of the Tennessee House of Representatives from the Giles County district
- In office 1823–1825
- Preceded by: John H. Camp
- Succeeded by: John H. Camp
- In office 1819–1821
- Preceded by: John Dickey
- Succeeded by: John H. Camp
- In office 1815–1817
- Preceded by: Amos Johnson
- Succeeded by: John Dickey

Member of the Tennessee Senate from the Sevier County district
- In office 1796–1797
- Preceded by: Position established
- Succeeded by: Samuel Glass

Personal details
- Born: 1757 Colony of Virginia, British America
- Died: January 1833 (aged 75–76) near Pulaski, Tennessee, U.S.
- Spouse: Sally Standifer (m. 1779)
- Children: 10, including Spencer
- Relatives: Spencer Clack (brother); Thomas Jones Clack (grandson)
- Occupation: Politician; military officer
- Military career
- Branch: Continental Army
- Rank: Captain
- Conflicts: American Revolutionary War; Battle of Guilford Court House; Battle of Cowpens; Battle of Stony Point

John Clack (1757 – January 1833) was an American politician and military officer from Tennessee. He served in the American Revolutionary War as a captain. He served in the Tennessee Senate from 1796 to 1797 and in the Tennessee House of Representatives for three non-consecutive terms in the 1810s and 1820s.

== Early life ==
John Clack was born in Virginia in 1757.

Clack served in the American Revolutionary War and fought at the battles of Guilford Court House and the Cowpens. According to his descendants, Clack received the surrender of Banastre Tarleton's cavalry after its defeat at Cowpens. He also fought at the Battle of Stony Point. He attained the rank of captain. He left his home in Abingdon, with his older brother Spencer to move to Tennessee. He first lived in Paint Rock, near the North Carolina border. They ultimately both settled in Sevier County.

== Career in Tennessee ==
Clack served as a justice of the peace in Sevier County in 1794 and was elected again in July 1795 and April 1796. Clack and his brother Spencer represented Sevier County in the 1796 Tennessee Constitutional Convention. He served on the committee that drafted the state's constitution. He served in the first and second assemblies of the Tennessee Senate, representing Sevier County, from 1796 to 1797.

In 1815, Clack moved with his family to Giles County. He then represented Giles County in the Tennessee House of Representatives from 1815 to 1817, 1819 to 1821, and 1823 to 1825.

== Personal life ==
Clack married Sally Standifer, daughter of James Standifer, in Henry County, Virginia, on November 4, 1779. They had one son and nine daughters, including Spencer, Martha, Hannah, Fanny, Naomi, and Mrs. Dickson. His son Spencer married Lucy Williams Jones, the sister of Thomas McKissick Jones. His brother Spencer, his son Spencer, and his grandson Thomas Jones Clack were Tennessee legislators.

Clack died in January 1833 at his "Mount Moriah" estate six miles west of Pulaski.
