= Thomas Clack =

South African cricketer (1876–1951)

Personal information
- Born: 6 February 1876; King William's Town, Cape Colony
- Died: 5 August 1951 (aged 75); Johannesburg, South Africa
- Source: Cricinfo, 6 December 2020

Thomas Clack (6 February 1876 – 5 August 1951) was a South African cricketer. He played in four first-class matches from 1906/07 to 1910/11.
