= Timpson (retailer) =

British multinational retailer

Timpson Group
- Type: Private limited
- Industry: Service industry
- Founded: 1865; 161 years ago
- Founder: William Timpson
- Headquarters: Wythenshawe, Manchester, England
- Number of locations: 2,100 (owned stores) with 110 Snappy Snaps franchises
- Area served: United Kingdom, Ireland
- Key people: John Timpson; James Timpson
- Services: Shoe repairs; Watch repair; Engraving; Mobile phone repairs; Dry cleaning; Photo processing
- Revenue: £330M
- Operating income: £31M
- Owner: John Timpson and family
- Number of employees: 5,400
- Subsidiaries: Max Spielmann; Timpson Key & Locker Solutions; Johnsons Cleaners UK; Snappy Snaps!; The Watch Lab; Flock Inns Limited; Timpson Property Investments; Photographic Retail 2008 Limited; Timpson Chef Academy Community Interest Company; Timpson Ireland Limited; Timpson Sol Limited
- Website: www.timpson.co.uk

The Timpson Group is a British and Irish service retailer that has a number of different brands across its portfolio of 2,100 stores, including Timpson, Max Spielmann, Johnsons The Cleaners, Snappy Snaps, Jeeves of Belgravia, The Watch Lab and Flock Inns.

The business is based in Wythenshawe, Manchester and is owned by Sir John Timpson.

== History ==
=== Origins ===
Timpson was founded in 1865 by shoemaker William Timpson and his brother-in-law Walter Joyce, selling shoes at 298 Oldham Road, Manchester. It expanded into shoe manufacturing in 1884 at factories in Kettering, and repairs in 1903. The company was listed on the London Stock Exchange in 1929. In the 1950s, turnover was around £10,000,000 and profits £900,000. The company moved its headquarters to Wythenshawe in 1964.

In the early-1960s, family member and graduate of the University of Nottingham John Timpson returned from a post-graduate management training scheme to join the family-owned business, becoming director responsible for buying in 1970. In 1973, after John's father Anthony was ousted as chairman by his uncle Geoffrey, the company was acquired for £28,600,000 by United Drapery Stores. John stayed with the firm, became managing director of leather and fur retailers Swears & Wells, and then, in 1975 was appointed managing director of the former family business, William Timpson Ltd.

In 1983, John led a £42,000,000 management buyout of William Timpson from then-owners Hanson Trust plc. To raise funds, £30,000,000 came from selling the freeholds of the firm's stores and leasing them back, the rest via debt financing from venture capitalists. After four years of poor trading, to reduce debt on the balance sheet, the company sold the loss-making shoe retail business for £15,000,000 to rival George Oliver, and focused on building the shoe repairing and key cutting business.

=== Retail acquisitions ===
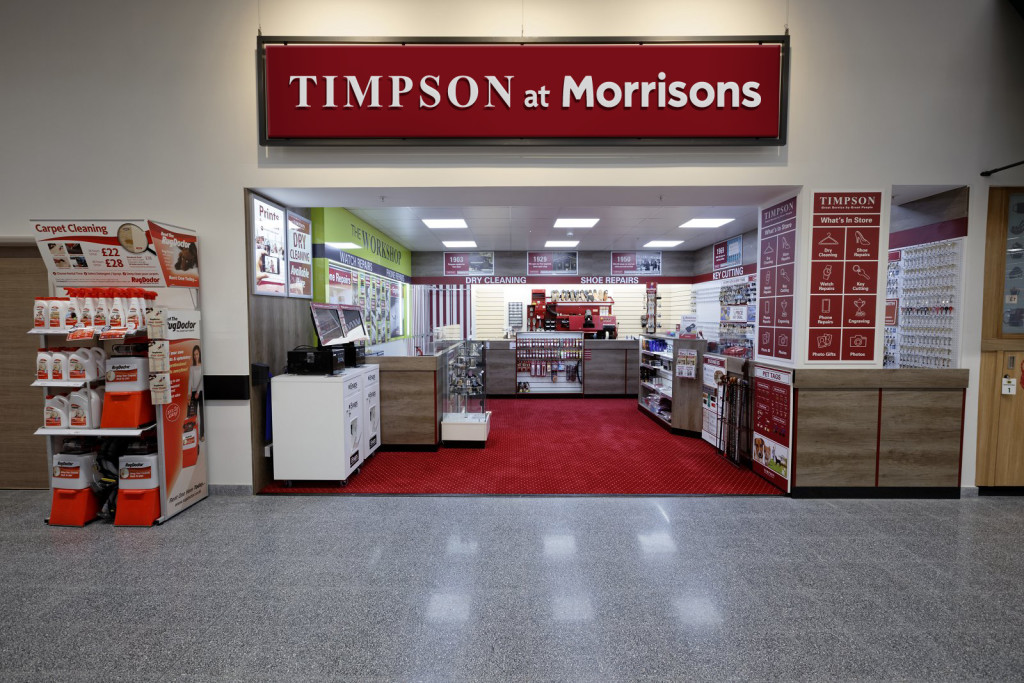
A Timpson shop inside a Morrisons supermarket, 2016.

After diversifying into engraving, watch repairs, dry cleaning and other services, John Timpson bought the other three shareholders out in 1991. The business has since grown through a series of acquisitions, with the notable purchases of Automagic and Mister Minit expanding the number of Timpson shops from 145 to 600 by 2003.

In June 2008, the Timpson Group acquired 40 Persil Service concessions located in Sainsbury's stores, then bought Max Spielmann out of administration later that same year. This marked the business's first real involvement in the photo printing industry, and was followed by the purchase of Snappy Snaps chain in 2013, Tesco Photo in 2014, and a partnership deal with Asda Photo in 2018.

Timpson agreed a partnership with Morrisons in May 2016, taking over the dry cleaning operations in 116 stores, before acquiring the dry cleaning business of Johnson Service Group in January 2017, which included Johnsons The Cleaners and Jeeves of Belgravia. In 2018, the business celebrated the opening of the Timpson Group's 2000th shop, and purchased The Watch Lab in April 2021.

During the COVID-19 pandemic, the company temporarily closed its 2,150 stores, along with many other retailers, and was noted for paying its colleagues full pay throughout the closures.

== Brands ==
=== Timpson ===
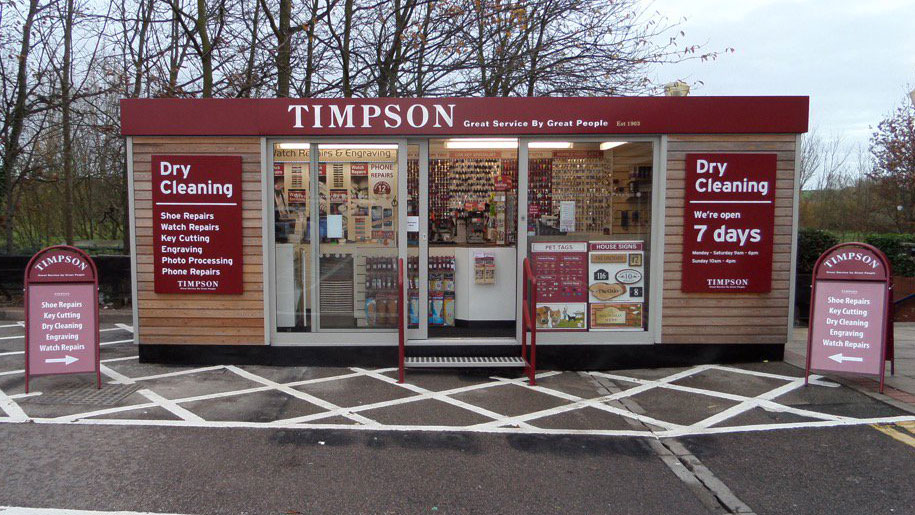
A Timpson supermarket pod store, in 2021.

Timpson Ltd is the largest service retailer in the UK, with 1300 shops across the UK and Ireland. Its main services include key cutting, shoe repairs, watch repairs, engraving, phone repairs, photo processing and dry cleaning.

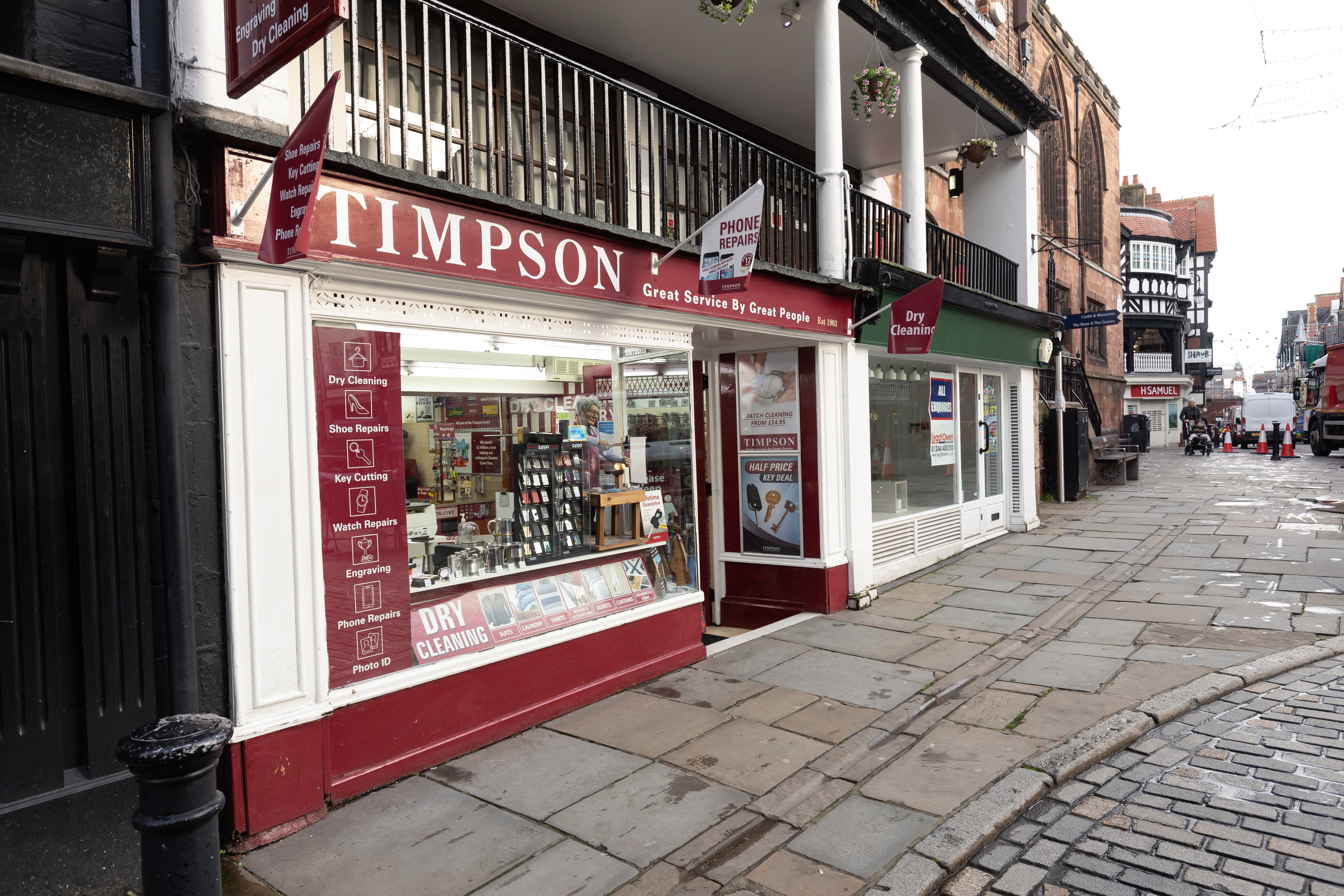
Timpson shop in Chester, 2020.

Over half of Timpson shops are now based in out-of-town supermarket sites, predominantly in "pod" stores that are constructed off-site and driven to their location in the supermarket car park. There are currently 400 pods in operation.

Timpson Direct was established in 2020 to develop the non-retail businesses within the Timpson Group. This includes self-service photo ID booths, self-service photo printing kiosks, Timpson Locksmiths, Timpson online and international franchising.

=== Max Spielmann ===
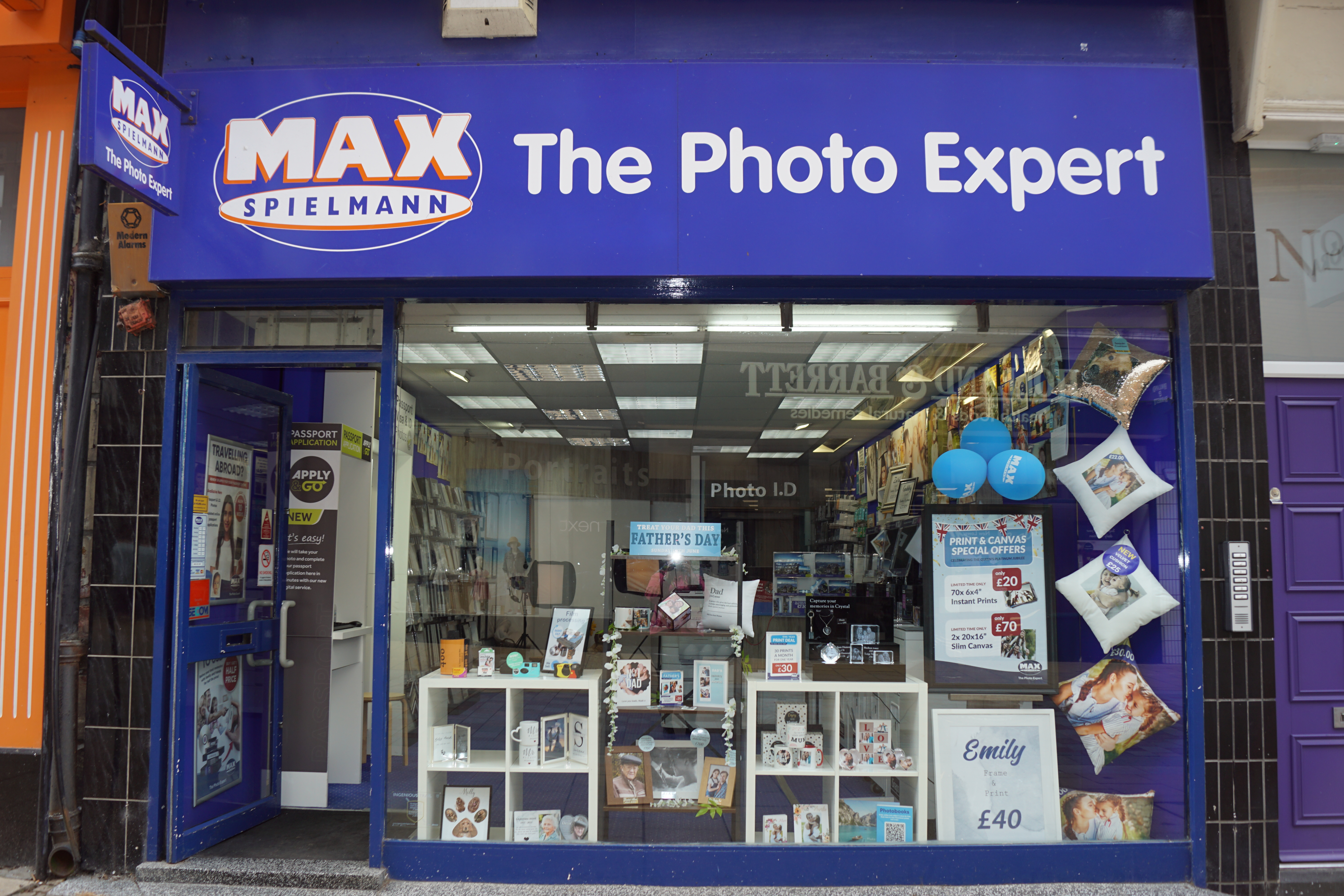
Max Spielmann shop in Darlington, 2022.

Max Spielmann is a specialist photo printing service chain in the UK, with 420 stores across the country. Acquired by the Timpson Group in 2008, the business was founded in 1951 by Wirral-based David Graham and his business partner, David Reed, and originally operated as a photo production service for chemists and hardware stores.

The first high street shops were called "Merseyside Photographic", before adopting the "Max Spielmann" name in the 1970s to focus on customers' access to German cameras, which were considered the best on the market at the time. Although some customers believe Max Spielmann founded the business, this is just a name for the company, rather than a real person.

The business was owned by the Graham family until 2001, when it was sold to the Bowie Castlebank Group, before getting bought out of administration by Timpson in 2008. Max Spielmann has since expanded its range of photo services, and now has shops in 420 locations across the UK, including its photo stores in Tesco and Asda supermarkets.

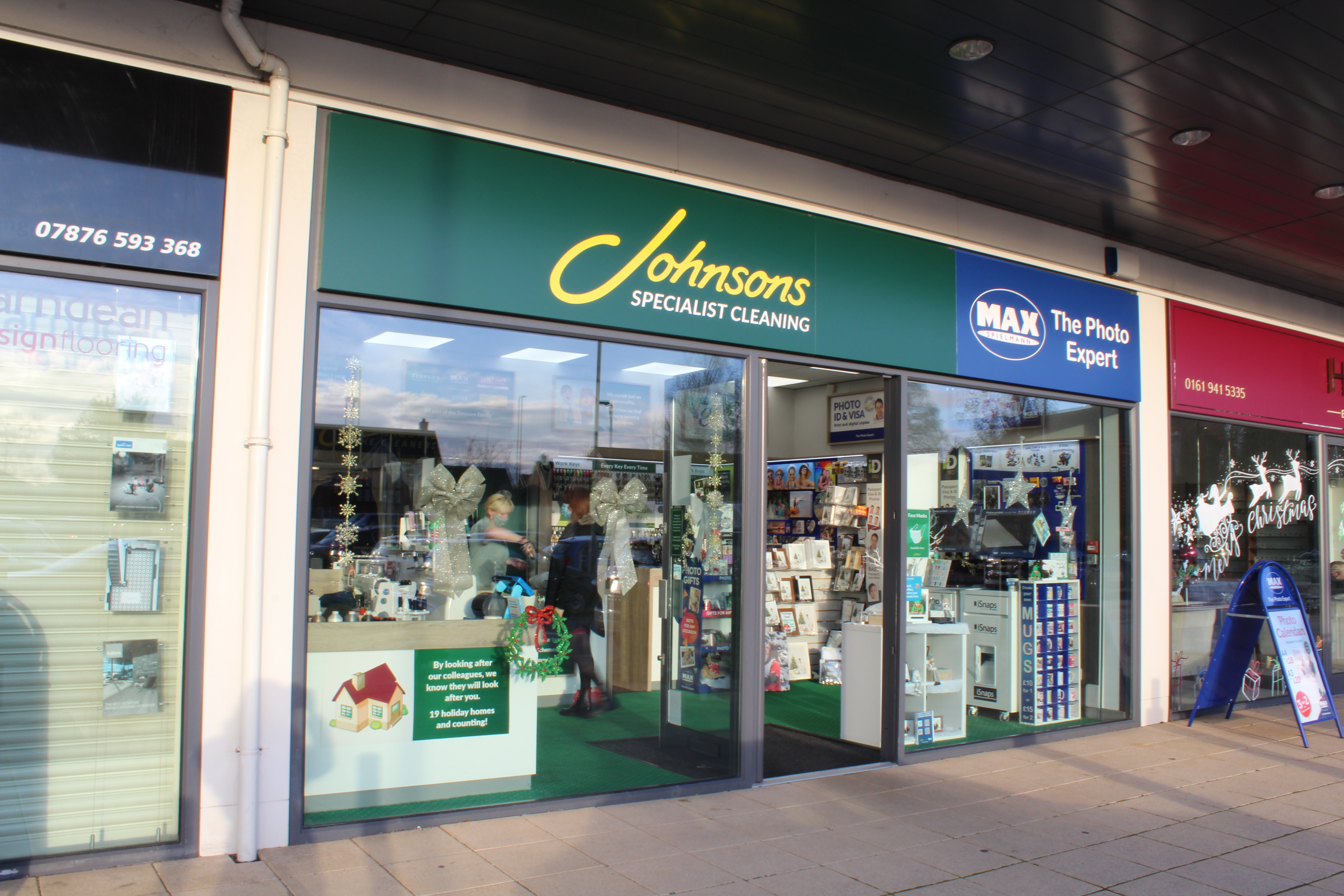
A joint Johnsons The Cleaners & Max Spielmann shop in Altrincham, Manchester.

=== Johnsons The Cleaners ===
Johnsons The Cleaners is a provider of specialist dry cleaning, textile repairs, photo printing, and key cutting, with more than 200 shops across the UK. It was bought by the Timpson Group in 2017, but the business' origins go back to 1817, when the Johnson Brothers set up their silk dyeing business in Liverpool, before amalgamating with two dry cleaning businesses in 1920.

The group expanded to 12 companies between 1920 and 1980, which were then restructured in 1995 when Johnson Cleaners Ltd was formed. The business opened its specialist centre in Rugby that same year, to meet the growing demand for specialist dry cleaning services across the country.

In 2003, Johnsons co-founded GreenEarth Cleaning, the world's largest brand of environmentally friendly dry cleaning, and now uses this product exclusively in all of its dry cleaning shops. In 2014, the business launched a dry cleaning partnership with Waitrose supermarkets, and was then acquired by the Timpson Group in 2017.

Timpson has since expanded the services on offer to include clothing repairs and alterations, key cutting, watch repairs and photo processing.

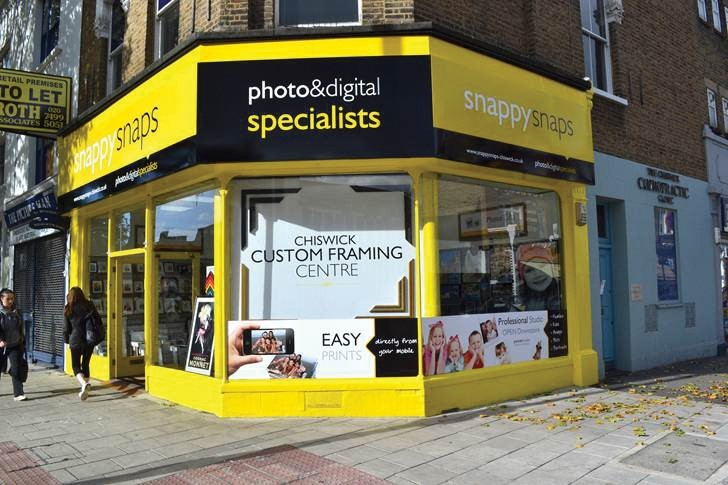
Snappy Snaps shop in Chiswick, London.

=== Snappy Snaps ===
Snappy Snaps is the fourth-largest photo service chain in the UK, consisting of 115 franchise stores and 16 company-owned stores. Snappy Snaps was founded in 1983 and the first franchise shop was opened in 1987, with many others following (especially around London) before the franchise was bought by the Timpson Group in 2011.

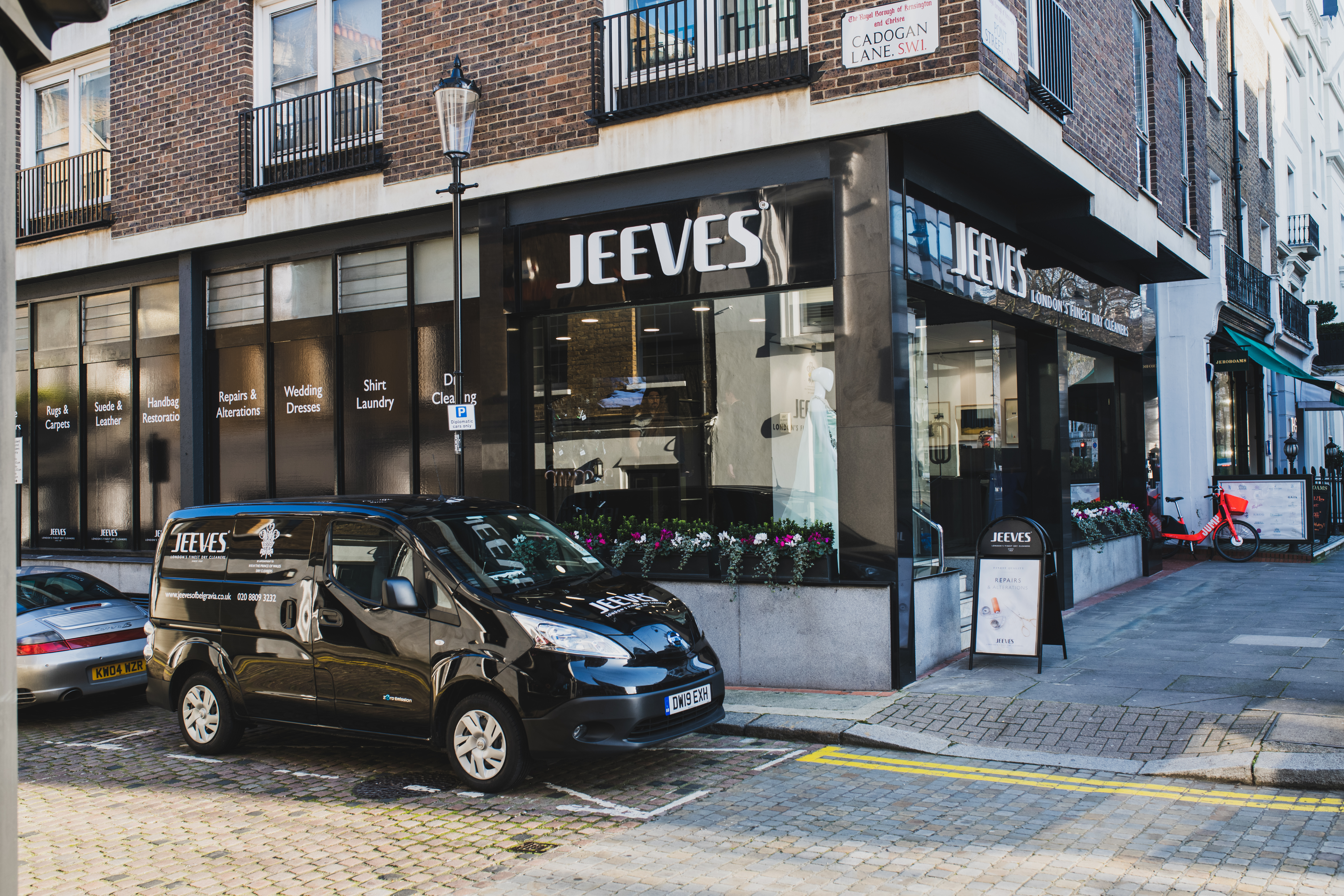
Jeeves of Belgravia shop in London, 2020.

=== Jeeves of Belgravia ===
Jeeves of Belgravia is a British multinational retailer specialising in dry cleaning and garment care. Established in Belgravia, London, in 1969, the business was purchased by Johnson Service Group in 2003, which was then acquired by the Timpson Group in 2017. The company has stores across 17 cities around the world, including New York, Hong Kong, Abu Dhabi, Doha, and Kuala Lumpur.

The business has held a Royal Warrant since 1980, for delivering dry cleaning services to the Prince of Wales.

=== The Watch Lab ===
The Watch Lab specialises in watch repair services and has 20 shops across the UK, from Glasgow to Southampton. The Watch Lab Holdings was purchased by the Timpson Group in April 2021.

=== Flock Inns ===
The Flock Inns group of pubs is also part of the Timpson Group and run by Roisin Timpson, wife of James Timpson. This includes The White Eagle in Rhoscolyn, The Oystercatcher in Rhosneigr, and The Partridge in Stretton, Warrington.

== Family ownership ==
=== Sir John Timpson CBE – Chairman ===
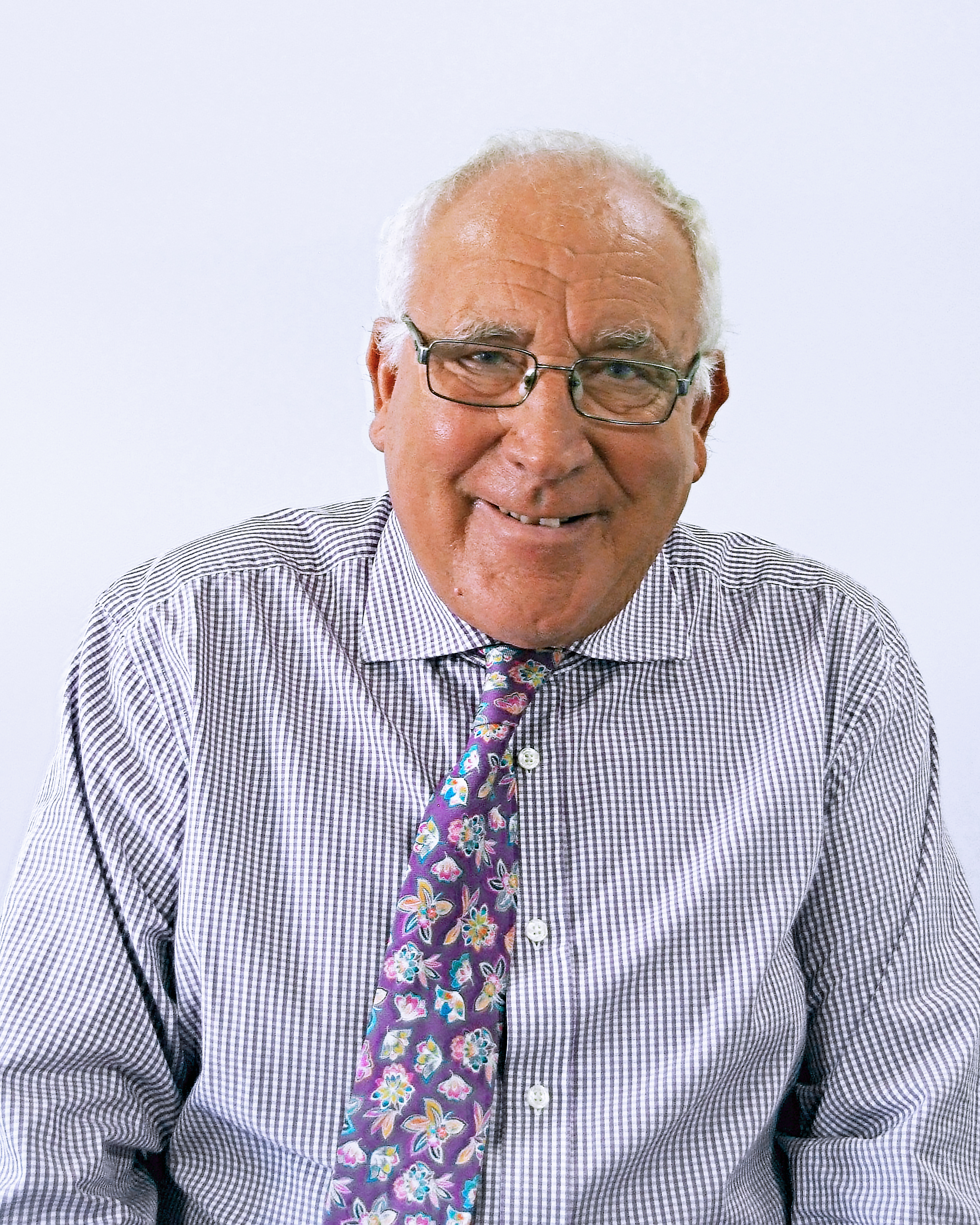
Sir John Timpson in 2017.

Sir John Timpson CBE is the chairman and owner of the Timpson Group. His book, Dear James, published in 2000, passes the lessons he's learnt in thirty years as a chief executive on to his son, James Timpson. His second book, How To Ride A Giraffe, was published in 2008, and describes his business philosophy.

Timpson was appointed a Commander of the Order of the British Empire (CBE) in 2008 for services to the retail industry, and was awarded a lifetime achievement award by the Institute of Enterprise and Entrepreneurs (IOEE) in 2014.

Throughout his marriage to his late wife, Alex, Timpson fostered 90 children, and they both received a Beacon Award in 2010 for philanthropy, before he was awarded a knighthood in 2017 for services to business and fostering. In 2018, Timpson chaired the High Streets Expert Panel, which was established by Jake Berry MP to diagnose the issues facing the British high street.

=== James Timpson OBE – previous CEO ===
James Timpson is a British businessman and was the CEO of the Timpson Group. He and his wife, Roisin, have three adult children together. Born in September 1971, he studied geography at Durham University and worked in the family retail business from 14 years of age, and joined full time in 1995 as an assistant area manager in London.

Timpson became Managing Director in 2002. He led the acquisition strategy to diversify the company away from shoe repairs, and pioneered the development of the "pod" supermarket concept. James Timpson was the first UK CEO to recruit ex-offenders, with the aim of having 10% of the company with prison experience, and was the Chair of the Employers Forum for Reducing Re-offending (EFFRR) until 2016. He also founded the Employment Advisory Board network across the prison estate, which links prisons with employers to improve the employment opportunities for ex-offenders upon release.

In 2011, he was appointed OBE for services to the employment and training of disadvantaged people, before being appointed HRH Prince of Wales Ambassador for responsible business in the North West in 2015. Timpson is Chair of the Prison Reform Trust and appeared in the Sunday Times 500 Most Influential list in 2016, gaining recognition for his recruitment of ex-offenders, and was then named Leader of the Year at the 2019 Lloyds Bank National Business Awards.

In March 2021, he was reappointed by the Prime Minister as Trustee of the Tate for a four-year period. He was a Sunday Times business columnist until December 2021, when he handed over to Julian Richer of Richer Sounds. He replaced Jonathon Porritt as Chancellor of Keele University in June 2022.

In July 2024, Timpson was appointed Minister of State for Prisons, Parole and Probation by the Prime Minister. He received a life peerage, allowing him to sit in the House of Lords in order to take up the post. He stepped down as CEO from the Timpson Group as a result of this appointment.

== Employment practices ==
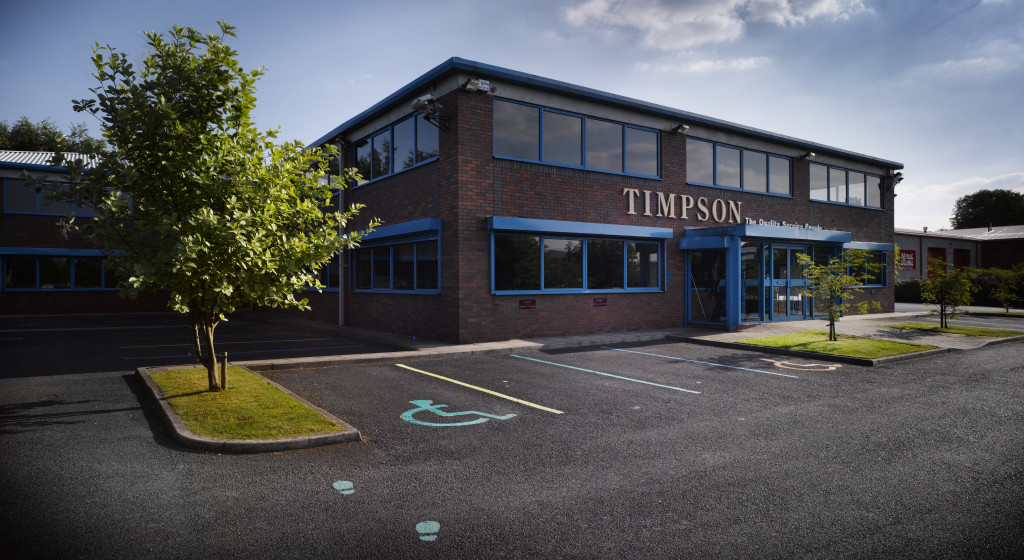
Timpson House offices in Wythenshawe

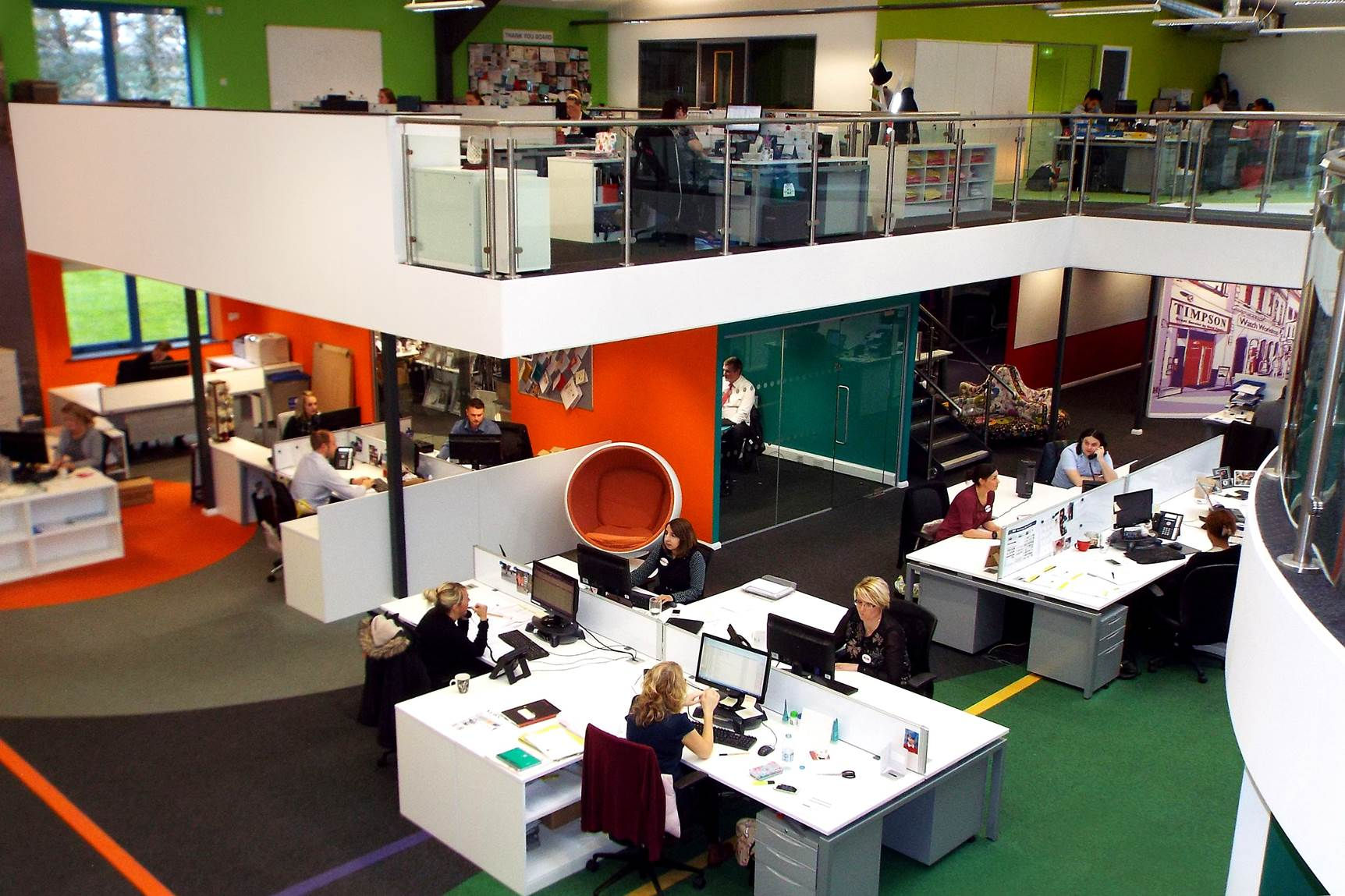
Timpson House offices in Wythenshawe

As of 2005, the Timpson Group has been in the top 10 of The Sunday Times list of "100 Best Companies to Work For" every time it has entered. It has a dedicated role called the Director of Happiness, who is tasked with ensuring employees are offered benefits such as access to holiday homes and weekly bonuses and lottery draws.

The company also pays employees a bonus for exceeding targets and gives them the day off work for events such as their birthday, their child's first day at school, the birth of their grandchild, and the death of their pet. The business operates with an "Upside-Down" management system, which gives employees the authority to do whatever they feel will deliver great service to customers. The company's management teams and Timpson House are set up to support their customer-facing colleagues in the shops. In 2007, Timpson launched the year-long "Dream Come True" programme, which spent £1 million paying for employees' eye surgeries, reuniting them with their families, and sending them on trips to Australia.

The company is well known for its policy of employing ex-convicts, who make up more than 10% of its workforce, and it runs pre-release training in several prisons. This is part of its focus on recruiting marginalised groups within society, and the business works with EFFRR to provide training and employment opportunities.

Timpson is certified as an accredited Fair Tax Mark business and was named as one of the UK's top 10 biggest taxpayers by The Times in 2023.

== Carbon footprint ==
The Timpson Group reported its total greenhouse gas emissions at 60,470 tonnes carbon dioxide equivalent (tCO2e), for the period from 1 January 2019 to 21 December 2019. The business has set a new target to achieve net-zero emissions across its entire operation by 2040.
