= H. Earl Clack House =

Historic house in Montana, United States

- U.S. National Register of Historic Places
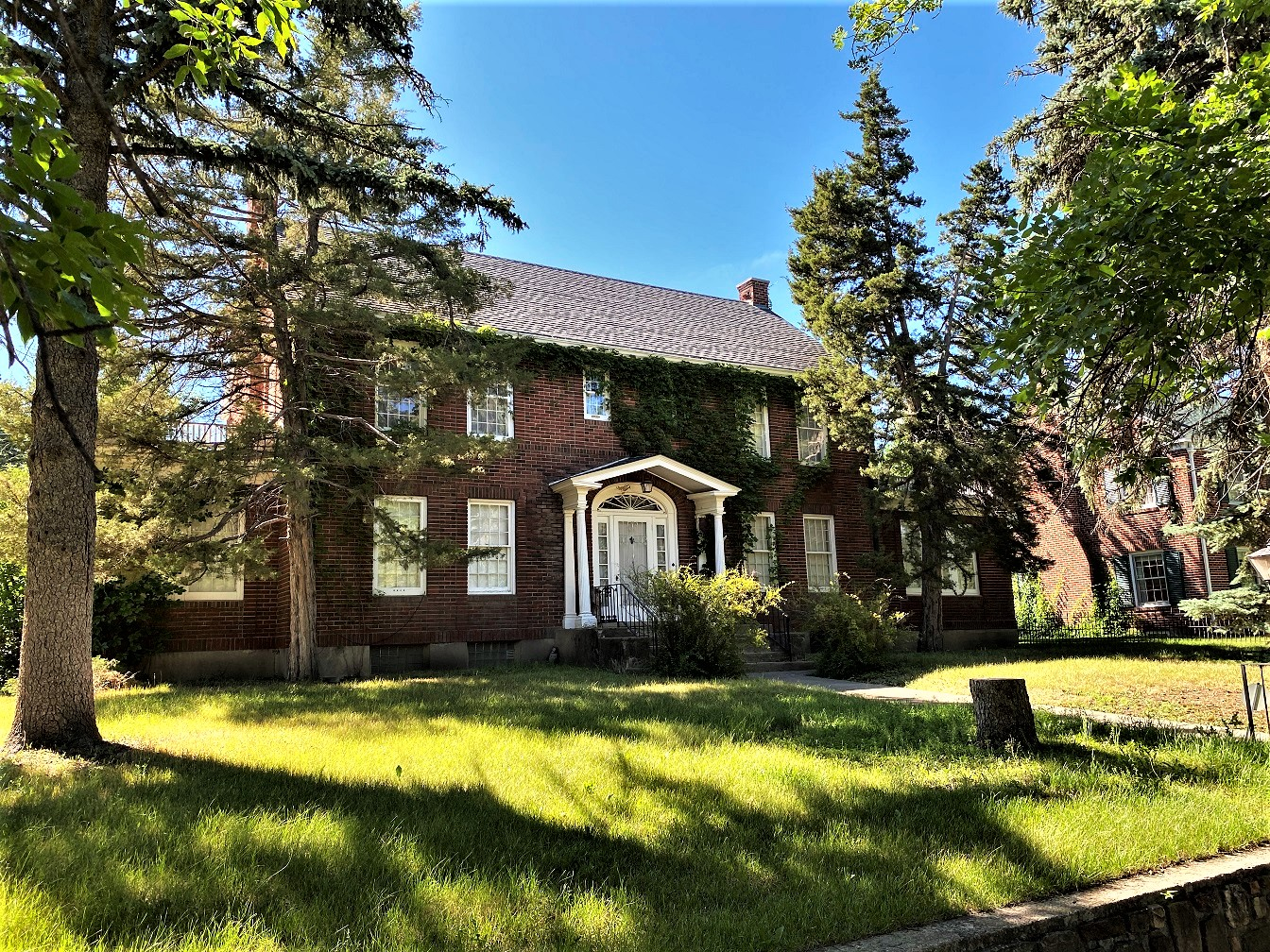

- Location within Montana Location within the United States
- Location: 532 Second Ave. Havre, Montana
- Coordinates: 48°32′54″N 109°40′48″W
- Area: less than one acre
- Built: 1927
- Architect: Bossuot, Frank
- Architectural style: Colonial Revival, Georgian Revival
- NRHP reference No.: 85003385
- Added to NRHP: October 24, 1985

The H. Earl Clack House is a historic house located at 532 Second Avenue in Havre, Montana. It is locally significant as a very good example of a classically inspired Georgian Revival dwelling. It was added to the National Register of Historic Places on October 24, 1985.

== Description and history ==
The house was built in 1927, and is the second house in Havre that the Clack family owned and lived in. Similar to many local architects, Frank Bossuot designed buildings in a variety of historical styles for his clients. The house is a classic example of the Georgian Revival style. Essentially L-shaped, the dwelling has two gable-end chimneys which contribute to its overall symmetry. The raised, porticoed entry with fanlight window above forms the central feature of the main facade. Large, rectangular multi-paned double hung windows provide ample illumination for the formally arranged floor plan, which features a central hallway flanked by the kitchen, dining room and living room. An enclosed one-story porch with a balustraded second floor balcony, a common feature on Georgian Revival homes, is attached to the south gable end of the house.

== See also ==
- H. Earl Clack Service Station, NRHP-listed in Phillips County, Montana
