= National Register of Historic Places listings in Montana =

This is a list of properties and historic districts in Montana that are listed on the National Register of Historic Places. The state's more than 1,100 listings are distributed across all of its 56 counties.

The locations of National Register properties and districts (at least for all showing latitude and longitude coordinates below), may be seen in an online map by clicking on "Map of all coordinates". (Note: The latitude and longitude information provided in this table was derived originally from the National Register Information System, which has been found to be fairly accurate for about 99% of listings. Some locations in this table may have been corrected to current GPS standards.)

This National Park Service list is complete through NPS recent listings posted October 23, 2026.

== Current listings by county ==
The following are approximate tallies of current listings by county. (Note: These counts are based on entries in the National Register Information Database as of March 13, 2009 and new weekly listings posted since then on the National Register of Historic Places web site. There are frequent additions to the listings and occasional delistings and the counts here are approximate and not official. New entries are added to the official Register on a weekly basis. Also, the counts in this table exclude boundary increase and decrease listings which only modify the area covered by an existing property or district, although carrying a separate National Register reference number.)

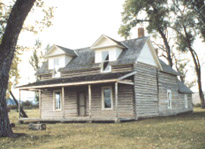
Chief Plenty Coups (Alek-Chea-Ahoosh) House, in Big Horn County

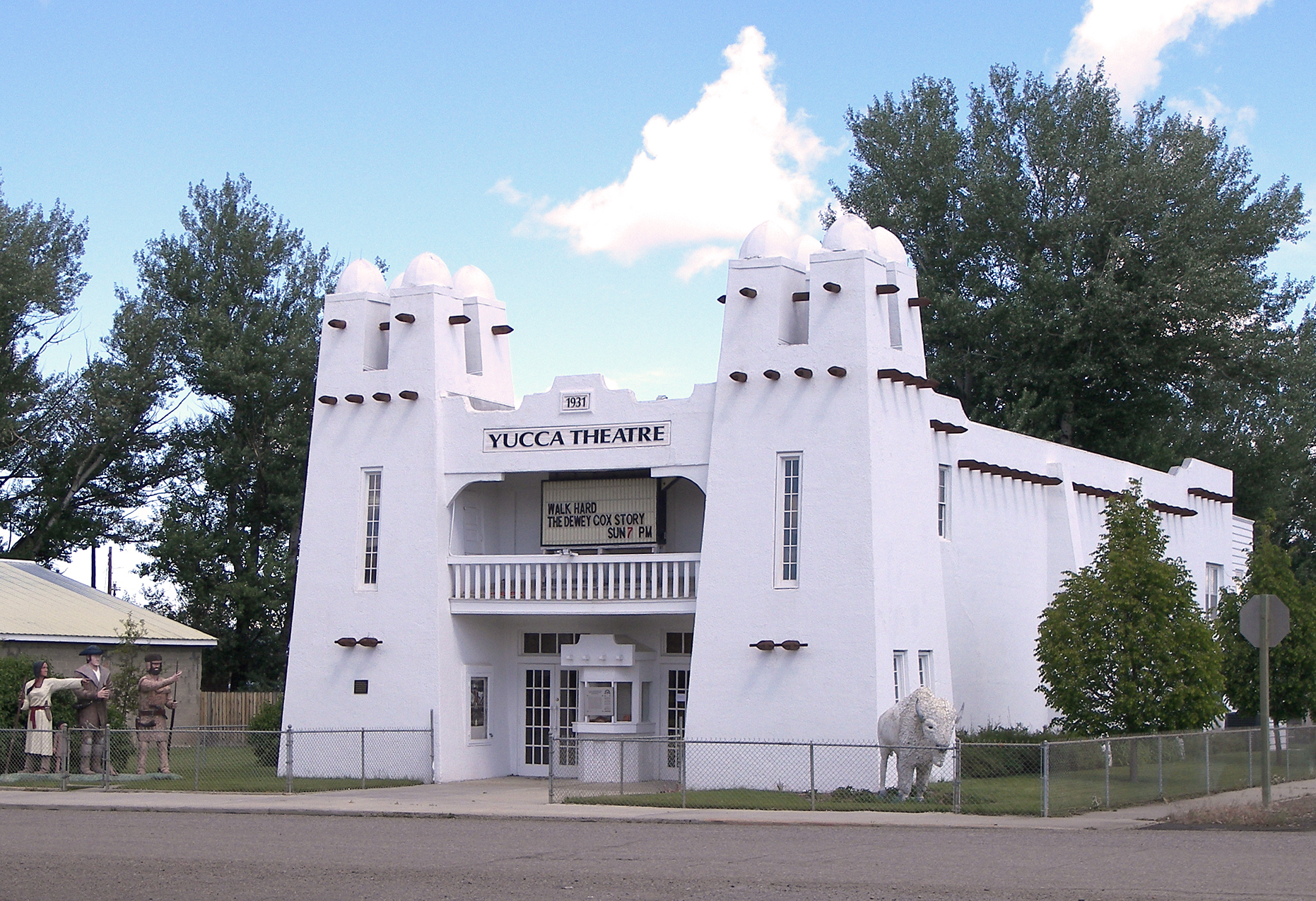
Yucca Theatre, in Treasure County

| | County | # of Sites |
|---|---|---|
| 1 | Beaverhead | 26 |
| 2 | Big Horn | 39 |
| 3 | Blaine | 10 |
| 4 | Broadwater | 11 |
| 5 | Carbon | 68 |
| 6 | Carter | 2 |
| 7 | Cascade | 50 |
| 8 | Chouteau | 21 |
| 9 | Custer | 18 |
| 10 | Daniels | 3 |
| 11 | Dawson | 13 |
| 12 | Deer Lodge | 35 |
| 13 | Fallon | 3 |
| 14 | Fergus | 47 |
| 15 | Flathead | 149 |
| 16 | Gallatin | 108 |
| 17 | Garfield | 1 |
| 18 | Glacier | 39 |
| 19 | Golden Valley | 7 |
| 20 | Granite | 12 |
| 21 | Hill | 10 |
| 22 | Jefferson | 15 |
| 23 | Judith Basin | 3 |
| 24 | Lake | 10 |
| 25 | Lewis and Clark | 80 |
| 26 | Liberty | 3 |
| 27 | Lincoln | 9 |
| 28 | Madison | 18 |
| 29 | McCone | 2 |
| 30 | Meagher | 6 |
| 31 | Mineral | 18 |
| 32 | Missoula | 88 |
| 33 | Musselshell | 2 |
| 34 | Park | 35 |
| 35 | Petroleum | 4 |
| 36 | Phillips | 9 |
| 37 | Pondera | 4 |
| 38 | Powder River | 2 |
| 39 | Powell | 20 |
| 40 | Prairie | 4 |
| 41 | Ravalli | 92 |
| 42 | Richland | 4 |
| 43 | Roosevelt | 4 |
| 44 | Rosebud | 24 |
| 45 | Sanders | 23 |
| 46 | Sheridan | 7 |
| 47 | Silver Bow | 23 |
| 48 | Stillwater | 15 |
| 49 | Sweet Grass | 8 |
| 50 | Teton | 1 |
| 51 | Toole | 7 |
| 52 | Treasure | 3 |
| 53 | Valley | 13 |
| 54 | Wheatland | 2 |
| 55 | Wibaux | 4 |
| 56 | Yellowstone | 49 |
| (less duplicates) | | (10) (Note: Going-to-the-Sun Road and Great Northern Railway Buildings are listed in both Flathead and Glacier counties, the Lewis and Clark Bridge spans the Missouri River between McCone and Roosevelt counties, the Butte, Anaconda and Pacific Railway Historic District and the Butte-Anaconda Historic District are split between Deer Lodge and Silver Bow counties, Fort Union Trading Post National Historic Site is listed in both Richland and Roosevelt counties (as well as McKenzie and Williams counties, North Dakota), Froggie's Stopping Place on the Whoop-Up Trail is listed in both Chouteau and Pondera counties, the Fred Robinson Bridge spans the Missouri River between Fergus and Phillips counties, the Judith Landing Historic District is listed in both Chouteau and Fergus counties, and the Red Lodge-Cooke City Approach Road Historic District is listed in both Carbon and Park counties. The Homestake Airway Beacon is in both Jefferson and Silver Bow counties.) |
| TOTAL | | 1,273 |

== Broadwater County ==
| | Name on the Register | Image | Date listed | Location | City or town | Description |
|---|---|---|---|---|---|---|
| 1 | Crow Creek Water Ditch | | March 29, 2001 (#01000323) | Helena National Forest-Headwaters Resource Area; 46°19′49″N 111°41′04″W | Townsend | |
| 2 | Eagle Guard Station | Eagle Guard Station | September 20, 2001 (#01001014) | 11 miles west of Townsend; 46°19′15″N 111°42′26″W | Townsend | |
| 3 | McMaster Ranch Historic District | | November 18, 2021 (#100007169) | 6043 US 12/287 East; 46°31′32″N 111°42′49″W | East Helena vicinity | |
| 4 | McCormick's Livery and Feed Stable Sign | | July 8, 1981 (#81000339) | West of Townsend; 46°19′06″N 111°37′43″W | Townsend | |
| 5 | Rankin Ranch | | May 11, 1976 (#76001119) | Avalanche Gulch Road; 46°37′46″N 111°34′11″W | Townsend vicinity | |
| 6 | St. Joseph's Catholic Mission Church | St. Joseph's Catholic Mission Church | November 5, 1998 (#98001339) | 3497 Montana Highway 284; 46°24′32″N 111°26′55″W | Townsend | |
| 7 | Spokane Hill Airway Beacon | | January 14, 2021 (#100006048) | Approximately 5 mi. northwest of Winston in the Spokane Hills; 46°31′52″N 111°42′09″W | Winston vicinity | |
| 8 | State Bank of Townsend | State Bank of Townsend | January 13, 1992 (#91001941) | 400 Broadway; 46°19′12″N 111°31′51″W | Townsend | |
| 9 | Stone Hill Springs Prehistoric District | Stone Hill Springs Prehistoric District | September 5, 2017 (#100001569) | Address restricted | Townsend vicinity | |
| 10 | Toston Bridge | Toston Bridge | July 20, 2005 (#05000720) | Spanning the Missouri River, on an abandoned segment of old U.S. Route 287, at Toston; 46°10′19″N 111°26′34″W | Toston | |
| 11 | Valley Masonic Lodge No. 21 | Valley Masonic Lodge No. 21 | August 7, 2019 (#100004236) | 131 South Spruce Street; 46°19′10″N 111°31′06″W | Townsend | |

== Carter County ==
| | Name on the Register | Image | Date listed | Location | City or town | Description |
|---|---|---|---|---|---|---|
| 1 | First National Bank of Ekalaka and Rickard Hardware Store Building | | November 19, 2015 (#15000815) | 103 & 105 N. Main St. 45°53′25″N 104°32′54″W | Ekalaka | |
| 2 | Medicine Rocks State Park | Medicine Rocks State Park | January 17, 2017 (#100000539) | 1141 MT 7; 46°02′43″N 104°27′30″W | Ekalaka vicinity | |

== Daniels County ==
| | Name on the Register | Image | Date listed | Location | City or town | Description |
|---|---|---|---|---|---|---|
| 1 | Daniels County Courthouse | Daniels County Courthouse | May 4, 1995 (#95000535) | 213 Main St. 48°47′27″N 105°25′12″W | Scobey | |
| 2 | Mansfield A. Daniels House | | June 4, 1997 (#97000503) | Approximately 2 miles west of Montana Highway 13 and 2 miles southwest of Scobey; 48°46′23″N 105°27′51″W | Scobey | Structure is no longer standing at this location as of 4 August 2022. |
| 3 | LaPierre Barn | | April 11, 2005 (#05000279) | Approximately 3.5 miles northwest of Scobey on Tande Ranch Rd. 48°50′41″N 105°28′42″W | Scobey | |

== Fallon County ==
| | Name on the Register | Image | Date listed | Location | City or town | Description |
|---|---|---|---|---|---|---|
| 1 | Baker Hotel | Baker Hotel | January 5, 2005 (#04001435) | 4 S. Main St. 46°22′07″N 104°16′28″W | Baker | |
| 2 | Cottonwood Creek Bridge | Cottonwood Creek Bridge | March 14, 2014 (#14000079) | Mi. 2.2 Ismay Rd. 46°27′24″N 104°47′19″W | Ismay | |
| 3 | Fallon County Jail | Fallon County Jail | July 31, 1998 (#98000946) | 723 S. Main St. 46°21′37″N 104°16′31″W | Baker | |

== Garfield County ==
| | Name on the Register | Image | Date listed | Location | City or town | Description |
|---|---|---|---|---|---|---|
| 1 | Hornaday Camp | Hornaday Camp | March 26, 1991 (#91000298) | 10 miles south of Montana Highway 200; 46°58′11″N 107°23′58″W | Sand Springs | |

== Golden Valley County ==
| | Name on the Register | Image | Date listed | Location | City or town | Description |
|---|---|---|---|---|---|---|
| 1 | Adams Hotel | Adams Hotel | December 6, 2005 (#05001377) | 1 Main St. 46°17′43″N 108°56′16″W | Lavina | |
| 2 | Grace Lutheran Church of Barber | Grace Lutheran Church of Barber | February 1, 1982 (#82003171) | West of Ryegate; 46°18′51″N 109°23′04″W | Ryegate | |
| 3 | Lavina School Historic District | Lavina School Historic District | June 26, 2023 (#100009087) | 214 1st St. East; 46°17′34″N 108°56′11″W | Lavina | |
| 4 | Lavina State Bank | Lavina State Bank | December 17, 2007 (#07001293) | 101 Main St. 46°17′40″N 108°56′15″W | Lavina | |
| 5 | Musselshell River Bridge | | December 29, 2025 (#100012496) | 2 miles (3.2 km) east of Ryegate on Buffalo Trail; 46°18′05″N 109°12′28″W | Ryegate vicinity | |
| 6 | Sims-Garfield Ranch | Sims-Garfield Ranch | August 27, 1980 (#80002419) | East of Ryegate on US 12; 46°18′05″N 109°12′47″W | Ryegate | |
| 7 | Slayton Mercantile Co. | Slayton Mercantile Co. | December 28, 2000 (#00001567) | 23 Main St. 46°17′47″N 108°56′17″W | Lavina | |

== Hill County ==
| | Name on the Register | Image | Date listed | Location | City or town | Description |
|---|---|---|---|---|---|---|
| 1 | Carnegie Public Library | Carnegie Public Library | July 24, 1986 (#86001934) | 447 4th Ave. 48°32′57″N 109°40′35″W | Havre | |
| 2 | H. Earl Clack House | H. Earl Clack House | October 24, 1985 (#85003385) | 532 2nd Ave. 48°32′54″N 109°40′48″W | Havre | |
| 3 | Fort Assinniboine | Fort Assinniboine | May 31, 1989 (#89000040) | County Route 82nd Ave. West, 0.5 miles southeast of U.S. Route 87; 48°29′59″N 109°47′39″W | Havre | Boundary increase approved April 2, 2018 |
| 4 | Havre Residential Historic District | Havre Residential Historic District | October 5, 1989 (#89001630) | Roughly bounded by 3rd St., 7th Ave., 11th St., 5th Ave., 10th St., 3rd Ave., 7th St., and 1st Ave. 48°32′48″N 109°40′38″W | Havre | |
| 5 | Heltne Oil Company | Heltne Oil Company | August 16, 1994 (#94000865) | 140 1st St. 48°33′14″N 109°40′44″W | Havre | |
| 6 | Kiwanis Meeting Hall | | March 31, 2010 (#10000133) | 17863 Beaver Creek Rd. 48°17′32″N 109°39′51″W | Havre | |
| 7 | Northern Montana College Girls Residence Hall | | April 4, 2024 (#100010160) | 300 West 11th Street; 48°32′32″N 109°40′38″W | Havre | |
| 8 | Too Close for Comfort Site (24HL101) | Too Close for Comfort Site (24HL101) | December 30, 1974 (#74001098) | Behind the Wahkpa Chu'gn Meat Market on U.S. Route 2; 48°33′40″N 109°42′55″W | Havre | |
| 9 | US Post Office and Courthouse-Havre Main | US Post Office and Courthouse-Havre Main | March 14, 1986 (#86000682) | 306 3rd Ave. 48°33′05″N 109°40′42″W | Havre | |
| 10 | Young-Almas House | Young-Almas House | October 14, 1980 (#80002421) | 419 4th Ave. 48°32′59″N 109°40′35″W | Havre | |

== Judith Basin County ==
| | Name on the Register | Image | Date listed | Location | City or town | Description |
|---|---|---|---|---|---|---|
| 1 | Judith River Ranger Station | Judith River Ranger Station | April 10, 1992 (#92000333) | Along the Middle Fork of the Judith River, southwest of Utica in Lewis and Clark National Forest; 46°50′51″N 110°17′25″W | Utica | |
| 2 | Meadowbrook Stock Farm | Meadowbrook Stock Farm | January 13, 1992 (#91001938) | U.S. Route 87; 47°01′35″N 109°50′57″W | Hobson | |
| 3 | Wood Lawn Farm | Wood Lawn Farm | January 27, 1993 (#92001762) | 5 miles west of Hobson on Utica Road 239; 46°59′17″N 109°58′36″W | Hobson | |

== Liberty County ==
| | Name on the Register | Image | Date listed | Location | City or town | Description |
|---|---|---|---|---|---|---|
| 1 | First Episcopal Methodist Church of Chester | First Episcopal Methodist Church of Chester | August 29, 1997 (#97000974) | Junction of 2nd St. and Madison; 48°30′39″N 110°57′44″W | Chester | |
| 2 | First State Bank of Chester | First State Bank of Chester | August 29, 1997 (#97000975) | Junction of Washington Ave. and 1st St., E. 48°30′47″N 110°57′52″W | Chester | |
| 3 | Pugsley Bridge | Pugsley Bridge | November 9, 2020 (#100005746) | Milepost 5.5 on Pugsley Bridge Rd. 48°17′28″N 111°02′48″W | Chester vicinity | |

== Lincoln County ==
| | Name on the Register | Image | Date listed | Location | City or town | Description |
|---|---|---|---|---|---|---|
| 1 | Ant Flat Ranger Station | Ant Flat Ranger Station | December 30, 1996 (#94001021) | United States Forest Service Road 36, 2 miles south of Fortine in the Kootenai National Forest; 48°43′26″N 114°52′35″W | Fortine | |
| 2 | The Coram Hotel | The Coram Hotel | September 4, 2012 (#12000593) | 302 California Ave. 48°23′36″N 115°33′09″W | Libby | |
| 3 | Eureka Community Hall | Eureka Community Hall | October 18, 1985 (#85003236) | Cliff St. 48°52′46″N 116°02′00″W | Eureka | |
| 4 | Farmers and Merchants State Bank | Farmers and Merchants State Bank | August 31, 1995 (#95001062) | 223 Dewey Ave. 48°52′50″N 115°03′08″W | Eureka | |
| 5 | Fortin Ranch House | | March 31, 2025 (#100011583) | 191 Ant Flat Road; 48°42′39″N 114°51′37″W | Trego vicinity | |
| 6 | The Heritage Museum | The Heritage Museum | March 27, 2020 (#100005148) | 34067 US 2; 48°22′19″N 115°32′38″W | Libby | |
| 7 | Libby High School | Libby High School | August 20, 2008 (#08000823) | Southwestern corner of the junction of Mineral Ave. and E. Lincoln Boulevard; 48°23′27″N 115°33′10″W | Libby | |
| 8 | Theodore Roosevelt Memorial Bridge | Theodore Roosevelt Memorial Bridge | December 27, 2006 (#06001178) | Crossing the Kootenai River at Riverside Dr. 48°28′12″N 115°53′11″W | Troy | |
| 9 | Troy Jail | Troy Jail | December 27, 2006 (#06001179) | 316 E. Yaak Ave. 48°27′47″N 115°53′21″W | Troy | |

== McCone County ==
| | Name on the Register | Image | Date listed | Location | City or town | Description |
|---|---|---|---|---|---|---|
| 1 | Gladstone Hotel | Gladstone Hotel | August 28, 1980 (#80004592) | 101 Main St. 47°25′02″N 105°35′15″W | Circle | |
| 2 | Lewis and Clark Bridge | Lewis and Clark Bridge | November 24, 1997 (#97001451) | Montana Highway 13 over the Missouri River; 48°04′02″N 105°32′06″W | Wolf Point | Extends into Roosevelt County |

== Meagher County ==
| | Name on the Register | Image | Date listed | Location | City or town | Description |
|---|---|---|---|---|---|---|
| 1 | Fort Logan and Blockhouse | Fort Logan and Blockhouse | October 6, 1970 (#70000360) | 17 miles northwest of White Sulphur Springs; 46°40′48″N 111°10′03″W | White Sulphur Springs | |
| 2 | Parberry Block East | Parberry Block East | April 22, 2009 (#09000237) | 18–20 East Main Street; 46°32′53″N 110°54′10″W | White Sulphur Springs | |
| 3 | Byron R. Sherman House | Byron R. Sherman House | September 15, 1977 (#77000820) | 310 2nd Ave., NE. 46°33′03″N 110°54′00″W | White Sulphur Springs | |
| 4 | Stockmen's Bank of Martinsdale | Stockmen's Bank of Martinsdale | May 1, 2013 (#13000224) | 9 Main St. 46°27′31″N 110°18′54″W | Martinsdale | |
| 5 | Union League of America Hall | Union League of America Hall | August 20, 1998 (#98001084) | Crawford St. at Central Ave., S. 46°32′42″N 110°54′08″W | White Sulphur Springs | |
| 6 | Wellman Block | Wellman Block | March 7, 1994 (#94000140) | 206 E. Main St. 46°32′52″N 110°54′04″W | White Sulphur Springs | |

== Musselshell County ==
| | Name on the Register | Image | Date listed | Location | City or town | Description |
|---|---|---|---|---|---|---|
| 1 | Roundup Central School | Roundup Central School | December 6, 2007 (#07001243) | 600 1st St., W. 46°26′50″N 108°32′37″W | Roundup | |
| 2 | St. Benedict's Catholic School | St. Benedict's Catholic School | July 21, 1988 (#88001120) | 524 1st St., W. 46°26′47″N 108°32′33″W | Roundup | |

== Petroleum County ==
| | Name on the Register | Image | Date listed | Location | City or town | Description |
|---|---|---|---|---|---|---|
| 1 | Cat Creek Oil Field Sign | Cat Creek Oil Field Sign | January 7, 2015 (#14001127) | Mi. 150, MT 200; 47°00′29″N 108°00′34″W | Mosby vicinity | |
| 2 | Howard Lepper Memorial Hall | | August 3, 2020 (#100005396) | 1105 Flatwillow Rd. 46°49′59″N 108°24′01″W | Flatwillow | Original hall was opened in 1921. It burned down in 1926 but was reconstructed and finished in 1929. |
| 3 | Winnett Block | Winnett Block | October 8, 2009 (#09000815) | 301 E. Main St. 47°00′16″N 108°20′53″W | Winnett | |
| 4 | Winnett School | Winnett School | April 6, 1995 (#95000383) | Junction of Moulton Ave. and Rowley St. 47°00′08″N 108°21′12″W | Winnett | Historic monument next to new building |

== Phillips County ==
| | Name on the Register | Image | Date listed | Location | City or town | Description |
|---|---|---|---|---|---|---|
| 1 | H. Earl Clack Service Station | H. Earl Clack Service Station | August 16, 1994 (#94000863) | Southern side of U.S. Route 2; 48°27′23″N 107°20′37″W | Saco | |
| 2 | Edwards & McLellan Block | Edwards & McLellan Block | March 17, 2022 (#100007498) | 101 South 1st St. East; 48°21′35″N 107°52′19″W | Malta | |
| 3 | Lookout Cave | Lookout Cave | October 22, 2018 (#100003039) | Address restricted | Zortman vicinity | |
| 4 | Milk River Bridge | | December 29, 2025 (#100012497) | Northside of Malta in Trafton Park; 48°21′49″N 107°52′26″W | Malta | |
| 5 | Phillips County Carnegie Library | Phillips County Carnegie Library | August 27, 1980 (#80002428) | S. 1st St. 48°21′35″N 107°52′34″W | Malta | |
| 6 | Fred Robinson Bridge | Fred Robinson Bridge | March 26, 2012 (#12000171) | Milepost 88, US 191, 51 miles (82 km) north of Lewistown; 47°37′51″N 108°41′06″W | Lewistown vicinity | Montana's Steel Stringer and Steel Girder Bridges Multiple Property Submission; extends into Fergus County |
| 7 | Saco Mercantile | Saco Mercantile | December 8, 1997 (#97001452) | 201 Taylor St. 48°27′22″N 107°20′30″W | Saco | |
| 8 | Sleeping Buffalo Rock | Sleeping Buffalo Rock | May 17, 1996 (#96000548) | Junction of U.S. Route 2 and Montana Highway 243; 48°28′10″N 107°32′56″W | Saco | |
| 9 | Zortman Ranger Station Historic District | | April 28, 2025 (#100011723) | Northwest End of Whitcomb Street; 47°55′07″N 108°31′41″W | Zortman | |

== Pondera County ==
| | Name on the Register | Image | Date listed | Location | City or town | Description |
|---|---|---|---|---|---|---|
| 1 | Conrad City Hall | Conrad City Hall | February 1, 1980 (#80002429) | 15 4th Ave., SW. 48°10′10″N 111°56′49″W | Conrad | |
| 2 | Froggie's Stopping Place on the Whoop-Up Trail | Froggie's Stopping Place on the Whoop-Up Trail | April 15, 1993 (#93000277) | Address restricted | Conrad | |
| 3 | Two Medicine Fight Site | Two Medicine Fight Site | October 6, 1970 (#70000361) | About 25 miles southeast of Browning; 48°28′N 112°28′W | Browning | |
| 4 | Valier Public School | Valier Public School | March 28, 1985 (#85000646) | 820 3rd St. 48°18′16″N 112°15′21″W | Valier | |

== Powder River County ==
| | Name on the Register | Image | Date listed | Location | City or town | Description |
|---|---|---|---|---|---|---|
| 1 | Cheever-Cain Ranch | | April 13, 2010 (#10000184) | 8 Trails End Rd. 45°36′47″N 105°55′19″W | Volborg | |
| 2 | Cross Ranch Headquarters | | February 23, 1996 (#96000118) | East of Montana Highway 59, roughly 26 miles south of Broadus; 45°05′44″N 105°19′10″W | Broadus | |

== Prairie County ==
| | Name on the Register | Image | Date listed | Location | City or town | Description |
|---|---|---|---|---|---|---|
| 1 | Grandey Elementary School | Grandey Elementary School | November 16, 1978 (#78001689) | Off U.S. Route 10; 46°47′29″N 105°18′30″W | Terry | |
| 2 | Powder River Bridge | Powder River Bridge | January 4, 2010 (#09001186) | Old U.S. Route 10 SW of Terry; 46°44′14″N 105°25′43″W | Terry | |
| 3 | State Bank of Terry | | August 3, 2026 (#100013305) | 101 S. Logan Avenue; 46°47′37″N 105°18′47″W | Terry | |
| 4 | Yellowstone River Bridge | Yellowstone River Bridge | January 4, 2010 (#09001187) | Milepost 1 on Interstate 94 (Old U.S. Route 10); 46°51′20″N 105°06′59″W | Fallon | |

== Richland County ==
| | Name on the Register | Image | Date listed | Location | City or town | Description |
|---|---|---|---|---|---|---|
| 1 | Burgess Garage | | December 30, 2004 (#04001434) | Corner of 3rd and Main; 47°41′06″N 104°37′15″W | Fox Lake | |
| 2 | Fort Union Trading Post National Historic Site | Fort Union Trading Post National Historic Site | October 15, 1966 (#66000103) | 15550 Highway 1804; 47°59′58″N 104°02′13″W | Williston, North Dakota, vicinity | |
| 3 | Peoples' Congregational Church | Peoples' Congregational Church | April 30, 1982 (#82003179) | 203 2nd Ave., SW. 47°42′53″N 104°09′33″W | Sidney | |
| 4 | Ruffatto School | | November 22, 2023 (#100009561) | 31600 Road 154; 48°07′34″N 104°53′25″W | Brockton | |

== Roosevelt County ==
| | Name on the Register | Image | Date listed | Location | City or town | Description |
|---|---|---|---|---|---|---|
| 1 | Fort Peck Agency | Fort Peck Agency | May 19, 1970 (#70000365) | In Poplar; 48°06′51″N 105°11′36″W | Poplar | |
| 2 | Fort Union Trading Post National Historic Site | Fort Union Trading Post National Historic Site | October 15, 1966 (#66000103) | 15550 Highway 1804; 47°59′58″N 104°02′13″W | Williston, North Dakota, vicinity | |
| 3 | Hale's Filling Station and Grocery | | August 16, 1994 (#94000864) | Lanark Townsite; 48°08′34″N 104°21′26″W | Bainville | |
| 4 | Lewis and Clark Bridge | Lewis and Clark Bridge | November 24, 1997 (#97001451) | Montana Highway 13 over the Missouri River; 48°04′02″N 105°32′06″W | Wolf Point | Extends into McCone County |

== Sheridan County ==
| | Name on the Register | Image | Date listed | Location | City or town | Description |
|---|---|---|---|---|---|---|
| 1 | Comertown Historic District | Comertown Historic District | October 27, 1993 (#93001149) | Roughly the entire community of Comertown, west of Westby; 48°53′49″N 104°15′00″W | Comertown | |
| 2 | Aage and Kristine Larsen Homestead | | October 27, 1993 (#93001146) | County Highway 516 north of Dagmar; 48°37′46″N 104°11′14″W | Dagmar | |
| 3 | Outlook Depot | Outlook Depot | October 27, 1993 (#93001144) | South of the western edge of Marr St., south of Block 10; 48°53′08″N 104°46′37″W | Outlook | |
| 4 | Raymond Grain Elevators Historic District | Raymond Grain Elevators Historic District | October 27, 1993 (#93001148) | Unnamed county road east of Montana Highway 16, northeast of Raymond; 48°52′43″N 104°34′39″W | Raymond | |
| 5 | Rocky Valley Lutheran Church | Rocky Valley Lutheran Church | October 27, 1993 (#93001145) | Junction of Ueland St. and an unnamed county road 48°52′54″N 104°23′18″W | Dooley | |
| 6 | Thornwood School | Thornwood School | October 28, 1993 (#93001147) | Unnamed county road approximately 17 miles west of Reserve; 48°36′06″N 104°47′55″W | Reserve | |
| 7 | Tipi Hills | Tipi Hills | August 1, 1975 (#75001085) | Address restricted | Medicine Lake | Includes tepee ring circles. |

== Sweet Grass County ==
| | Name on the Register | Image | Date listed | Location | City or town | Description |
|---|---|---|---|---|---|---|
| 1 | Big Timber Town Hall | Big Timber Town Hall | February 13, 1998 (#98000125) | 225 McLeod St. 45°50′02″N 109°57′11″W | Big Timber | |
| 2 | Brannin Ranch | | January 13, 1989 (#88003142) | West of Melville on Sweet Grass Creek; 46°07′27″N 110°11′53″W | Melville | |
| 3 | Carnegie Public Library | Carnegie Public Library | July 11, 2002 (#02000725) | 314 McLeod St. 45°49′57″N 109°57′07″W | Big Timber | |
| 4 | Grand Hotel | Grand Hotel | September 19, 1985 (#85002424) | 139 McLeod St. 45°50′04″N 109°57′14″W | Big Timber | |
| 5 | Waborn (Wabe) and Sarah E. Harrison Ranch House | | August 28, 1998 (#98001111) | Roughly located at the confluence of the Sweet Grass Creek and the Yellowstone River; 45°47′16″N 109°46′57″W | Greycliff | |
| 6 | John Otto Spannring Family Farm | | February 23, 1995 (#95000145) | 7 miles east of Big Timber; 45°48′50″N 109°50′48″W | Big Timber | |
| 7 | St. Mark's Episcopal Church | St. Mark's Episcopal Church | July 21, 1995 (#95000900) | W. 4th Ave. 45°49′53″N 109°57′12″W | Big Timber | |
| 8 | Yellowstone Crossing, Bozeman Trail | | December 1, 1978 (#78003407) | Northeast of Springdale on U.S. Route 10; 45°45′13″N 110°09′56″W | Springdale | part of the Bozeman Trail |

== Teton County ==
| | Name on the Register | Image | Date listed | Location | City or town | Description |
|---|---|---|---|---|---|---|
| 1 | Teton County Courthouse | Teton County Courthouse | November 29, 2006 (#06001093) | 1 Main Ave., S. 47°48′39″N 112°10′53″W | Choteau | |

== Toole County ==
| | Name on the Register | Image | Date listed | Location | City or town | Description |
|---|---|---|---|---|---|---|
| 1 | Bethany Lutheran Church | Bethany Lutheran Church | December 14, 1993 (#93001375) | 0.25 miles (0.40 km) south of Gus Blaze Rd. 48°41′37″N 111°38′41″W | Oilmont | |
| 2 | Kevin Depot | Kevin Depot | August 11, 1980 (#80002433) | Central Ave. and 1st St. 48°44′45″N 111°58′04″W | Kevin | |
| 3 | Marias River Bridge | Marias River Bridge | March 26, 2012 (#12000173) | Mile 6, Marias Valley Rd. 48°25′38″N 111°53′26″W | Shelby vicinity | part of the Montana's Steel Stringer and Steel Girder Bridges Multiple Property Submission |
| 4 | Rainbow Conoco | Rainbow Conoco | August 16, 1994 (#94000866) | 400 Main St. 48°30′23″N 111°51′31″W | Shelby | |
| 5 | Rocky Springs Segment of the Whoop-Up Trail | Rocky Springs Segment of the Whoop-Up Trail | April 15, 1993 (#93000278) | Address restricted | Kevin | |
| 6 | Shelby Town Hall | Shelby Town Hall | February 14, 2006 (#06000040) | 100 Montana Ave. 48°30′16″N 111°51′15″W | Shelby | |
| 7 | US Customs Building | US Customs Building | February 28, 1991 (#91000152) | Interstate 15 just south of the Canada–US border 48°59′54″N 111°57′31″W | SweetGrass | |

== Treasure County ==
| | Name on the Register | Image | Date listed | Location | City or town | Description |
|---|---|---|---|---|---|---|
| 1 | Big Horn River Bridge | | January 4, 2010 (#09001188) | Milepost 2 on Montana Highway 104 (Old U.S. Route 10); 46°08′50″N 107°28′03″W | Custer | |
| 2 | Sanders Gymnasium and Community Hall | | August 29, 1997 (#97000976) | Old Montana Highway 10, 6 miles east of Hysham; 46°17′25″N 107°06′06″W | Sanders | |
| 3 | Yucca Theatre | Yucca Theatre | January 7, 1994 (#93001447) | 520 Division St. 46°17′34″N 107°14′00″W | Hysham | |

== Wheatland County ==
| | Name on the Register | Image | Date listed | Location | City or town | Description |
|---|---|---|---|---|---|---|
| 1 | Graves Hotel | Graves Hotel | August 6, 1980 (#80002434) | 106 S. Central Ave. 46°26′01″N 109°49′50″W | Harlowton | |
| 2 | Milwaukee Road Historic District | Milwaukee Road Historic District | July 8, 1988 (#88001024) | Southern end of Central Ave. 46°25′49″N 109°49′38″W | Harlowton | |

=== Former listings ===
| | Name on the Register | Image | Date listed | Date removed | Location | City or town | Description |
|---|---|---|---|---|---|---|---|
| 1 | McQuitty Building | | February 15, 1980 (#80002435) | June 3, 1986 | 121 N. Central Ave. | Harlowton | Demolished in June 1980. |

== Wibaux County ==
| | Name on the Register | Image | Date listed | Location | City or town | Description |
|---|---|---|---|---|---|---|
| 1 | St. Peter's Catholic Church | St. Peter's Catholic Church | March 14, 1990 (#90000356) | W. Orgain Ave. 46°59′14″N 104°11′28″W | Wibaux | |
| 2 | Vogt-Nunberg Farm | Vogt-Nunberg Farm | April 10, 2008 (#08000269) | 7262 Montana Highway 7; 46°53′07″N 104°12′01″W | Wibaux | |
| 3 | Wibaux Commercial Historic District | Wibaux Commercial Historic District | December 28, 1989 (#89002170) | Roughly bounded by W. Orgain Ave., Wibaux, E. 1st Ave., S., and E 46°59′11″N 104°11′15″W | Wibaux | |
| 4 | Pierre Wibaux House | Pierre Wibaux House | September 10, 1971 (#71000483) | Orgain Ave. 46°59′12″N 104°11′06″W | Wibaux | |

== See also ==
- List of National Historic Landmarks in Montana
