= Hornaday Camp =

- U.S. National Register of Historic Places
- Hornaday's 1886 "Sketch Map of the Hunt for Buffalo"

- Location within Montana Location within the United States
- Location: 10 miles south of Montana Highway 200
- Coordinates: 46°58′11″N 107°23′58″W
- NRHP reference No.: 91000298
- Added to NRHP: March 26, 1991

Hornaday Camp (24GH362) is a historic campsite located 10 miles (16 km) south of Montana Highway 200 near Sand Springs, Montana. William Temple Hornaday used the site during his 1886 expedition for the Smithsonian Institution to preserve the American buffalo. A noted zoologist and taxidermist, Hornaday was named Chief Taxidermist of the Smithsonian in 1882. Upon his return from Montana, Hornaday created the American Bison Group exhibit to present his findings. The exhibit was considered an achievement in museum taxidermy and popularized the practice of grouping animal specimens in natural habitats instead of mounting each specimen separately on a pedestal. Hornaday's experience with the endangered buffalo led him to pursue conservation efforts, including the founding of the National Zoo. Hornaday's Montana campsite is the only remaining site associated with his life and efforts.

The camp was added to the National Register of Historic Places on March 26, 1991.
