= Sanders Gymnasium and Community Hall =

- U.S. National Register of Historic Places
- Location within Montana Location within the United States
- Location: Sanders, Montana, on Old Montana Highway 10, 6 miles east of Hysham,
- Coordinates: 46°17′25″N 107°06′06″W
- Area: less than one acre
- Built: 1940
- Built by: Steve Mercer and Sons
- Architect: J. G. Link & Company
- NRHP reference No.: 97000976
- Added to NRHP: August 29, 1997

The Sanders Gymnasium and Community Hall, located in Sanders, Montana, was added to the National Register of Historic Places in 1997.

A placard at the site reads:

A sense of community and a place to gather were essential in homesteading settlements like Sanders. In 1910, the area's residents rallied together to build a club house on this site. Each donated $15 or its equivalent in labor, and the building, though crudely assembled, served for nearly thirty years. By the late 1930s, the club house was in disrepair. The Sanders School District wanted a facility that could double as a gymnasium serving Sanders Elementary School next door. A bond election secured funds and the old building was cleared away. Acclaimed regional architects J. G. Link & Company drew the plans while Billings contractor Steve Mercer won the bid at $3,500. The rustic exterior of rugged square-notched logs is a surprising contrast to the interior's lofty ceiling of arched fir and polished hardwood floor. A basketball court, raised stage, built-in seating and state-of-the-art lighting reflected modern technologies despite a lack of indoor plumbing. A community dance christened the new hall and gymnasium on June 29, 1940. Sanders' population began to dwindle and the school closed in 1948. It was later moved to Hysham, but the front gate and two-hole privy remain part of the historic landscape. The hall continued to host dances, reunions, receptions, school plays, and rousing games. Local residents, including descendants of area homesteaders, have carefully refurbished this well-loved place. Its unassuming presence is a shining example of grand things that can be found in unexpected places.

The building is significant "as a representative work" by architect John Gustavus Link. Its NRHP nomination notes that

Unlike many other more stylish and substantial buildings, Link's design for the Sanders gym employs functional rustic log construction, in a direct and utilitarian manner. The rugged log exterior does not belie the more finished interior gymnasium, its arched fir pressboard ceiling formed to fit under the gable roof. From the exterior, the building fits with the body of log architecture that was common to frontier settlements, with its square notched logs, plain rectangular massing, basic gable rooflines, shingled gable ends, and lack of adornment. By contrast, the carefully designed ulterior, with its formed wood ceiling arch, highly polished hardwood floor, built-in seating, raised stage and electrical lighting reflects the modern design ideals and technologies of the early 20th century.
