= Cat Creek Oil Field Sign =

Sign in Petroleum County, Montana

- U.S. National Register of Historic Places
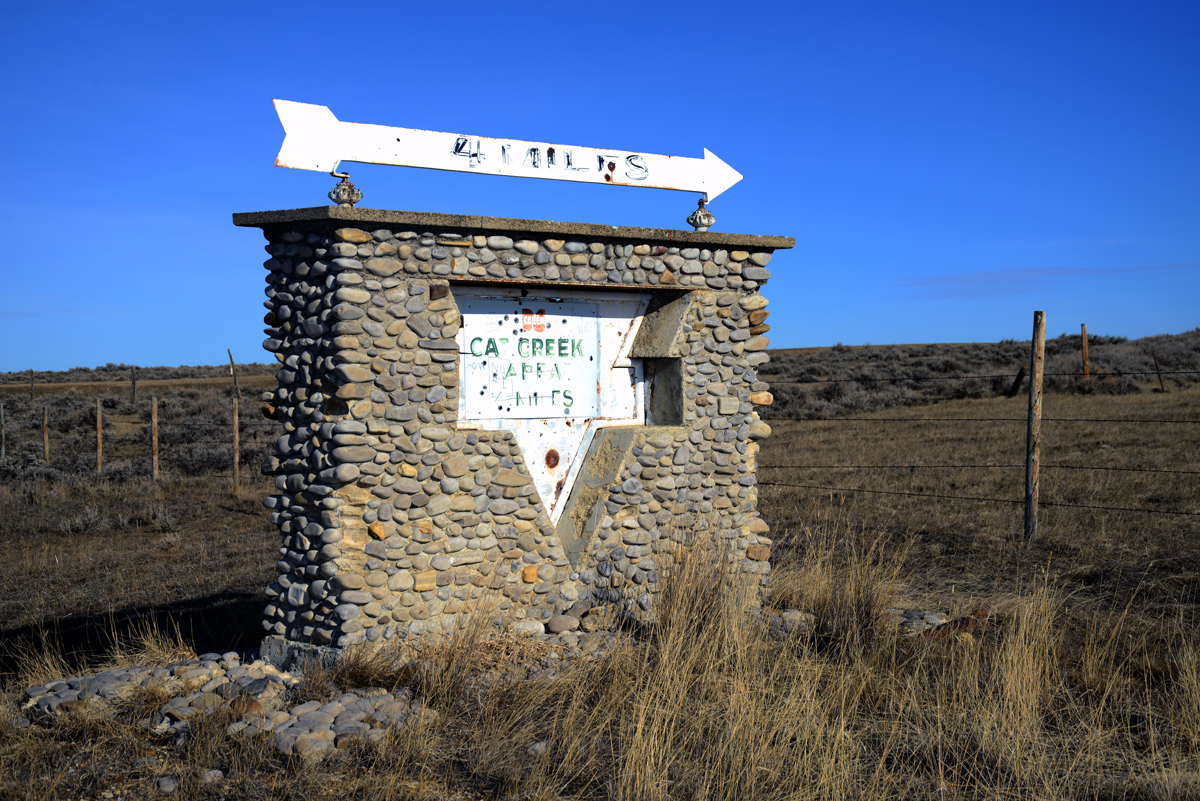

- Location within Montana Location within the United States
- Location: Mile 150 on Montana Highway 200, about 5 miles west of Mosby, Montana
- Coordinates: 47°0′29″N 108°0′34″W
- NRHP reference No.: 14001127
- Added to NRHP: January 7, 2015

The Cat Creek Oil Field Sign, located about 5 miles (8.0 km) west of the town of Mosby at about mile 150 on Highway 200, in Petroleum County, Montana, was listed on the National Register of Historic Places in 2015.

It is "an isolated and lonely reminder of the once booming oil industry presence in central Montana during the infancy of commercial oil development" in Montana. It commemorates the Cat Creek Oil Field which boomed during 1920-1925 and again in the 1940s.
