= Mosby, Montana =

- Unincorporated community
- Location within Montana Location within the United States
- Coordinates: 46°59′32″N 107°53′01″W
- Country: United States
- State: Montana
- County: Garfield
- Elevation: 2,510 ft (770 m)
- Time zone: UTC-7 (Mountain (MST))
  - Summer (DST): UTC-6 (MDT)
- ZIP codes: 59058
- GNIS feature ID: 774406

Mosby (also Half-Breed Crossing) is an unincorporated community in southwestern Garfield County, Montana, United States. It lies along Highway 200 southwest of the town of Sand Springs, its nearest neighboring settlement.

== History ==
Originally known as Baldwin, this town takes its name from the area’s first settler, who arrived in 1891. Mosby had a post office that opened on June 29, 1904, was moved on February 18, 1983, and closed on July 30, 2015

== Climate ==
According to the Köppen Climate Classification system, Mosby has a semi-arid climate, abbreviated "BSk" on climate maps.
