= Cross Ranch Headquarters =

- U.S. National Register of Historic Places
- Location within Montana Location within the United States
- Location: East of Montana Highway 59, roughly 26 miles south of Broadus, Montana
- Coordinates: 45°05′44″N 105°19′10″W
- NRHP reference No.: 96000118
- Added to NRHP: February 23, 1996

Cross Ranch Headquarters is a historic ranch located east of Montana Highway 59 roughly 26 miles (42 km) south of Broadus, Montana, USA. Rancher Spencer Fullerton Baird Biddle built the headquarters in 1893, one year after purchasing the ranch. A Philadelphia native, Biddle moved to Montana in 1881; he quickly became a prominent rancher, and by 1885 he was both an early member of the Montana Stockgrowers Association and a representative in Montana's territorial legislature. At the time, ranchers were a powerful influence on state government, and Biddle's legislature passed several laws supported by the ranching industry.

Biddle's ranch headquarters has a French Colonial design, an unusual example of a high architectural style in a ranch building. The building features a porch encircling all four sides and supported by wooden columns, piece sur piece walls, and a hip roof.

The ranch was added to the National Register of Historic Places on February 23, 1996.
