= Big Timber Town Hall =

- U.S. National Register of Historic Places
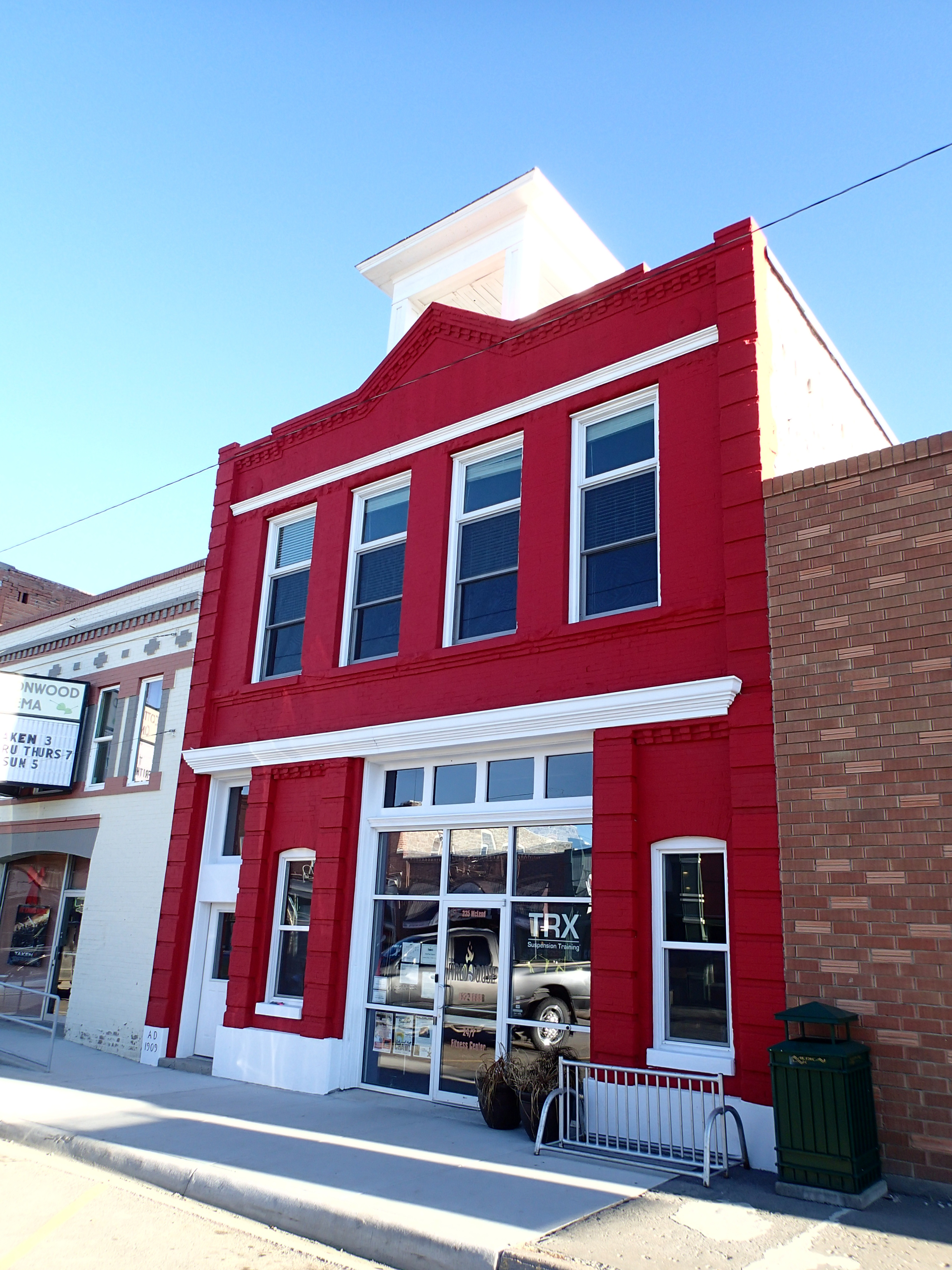

- Location within Montana Location within the United States
- Location: 225 McLeod St., Big Timber, Montana
- Coordinates: 45°50′2″N 109°57′11″W
- Area: less than one acre
- Built by: Larson, Frank
- Architectural style: Western Commercial
- NRHP reference No.: 98000125
- Added to NRHP: February 13, 1998

Big Timber Town Hall, at 225 McLeod St. in Big Timber in Sweet Grass County, Montana, was listed on the National Register of Historic Places in 1998.

It has Western Commercial architecture.

It is a 30 by 60 feet (9.1 m × 18.3 m) two-story building with a rooftop belfry which served as Big Timber's town government center from 1909 to 1960. The town offices were on the second floor, and the fire department and jail were on the first floor. The jail was in a one-story addition added in 1913, which was demolished in 1955 to make way for a 30 by 55 feet (9.1 m × 16.8 m) fire hall expansion.

It has also been known as Big Timber Fire Hall.
