= Fred Robinson Bridge =

- U.S. National Register of Historic Places
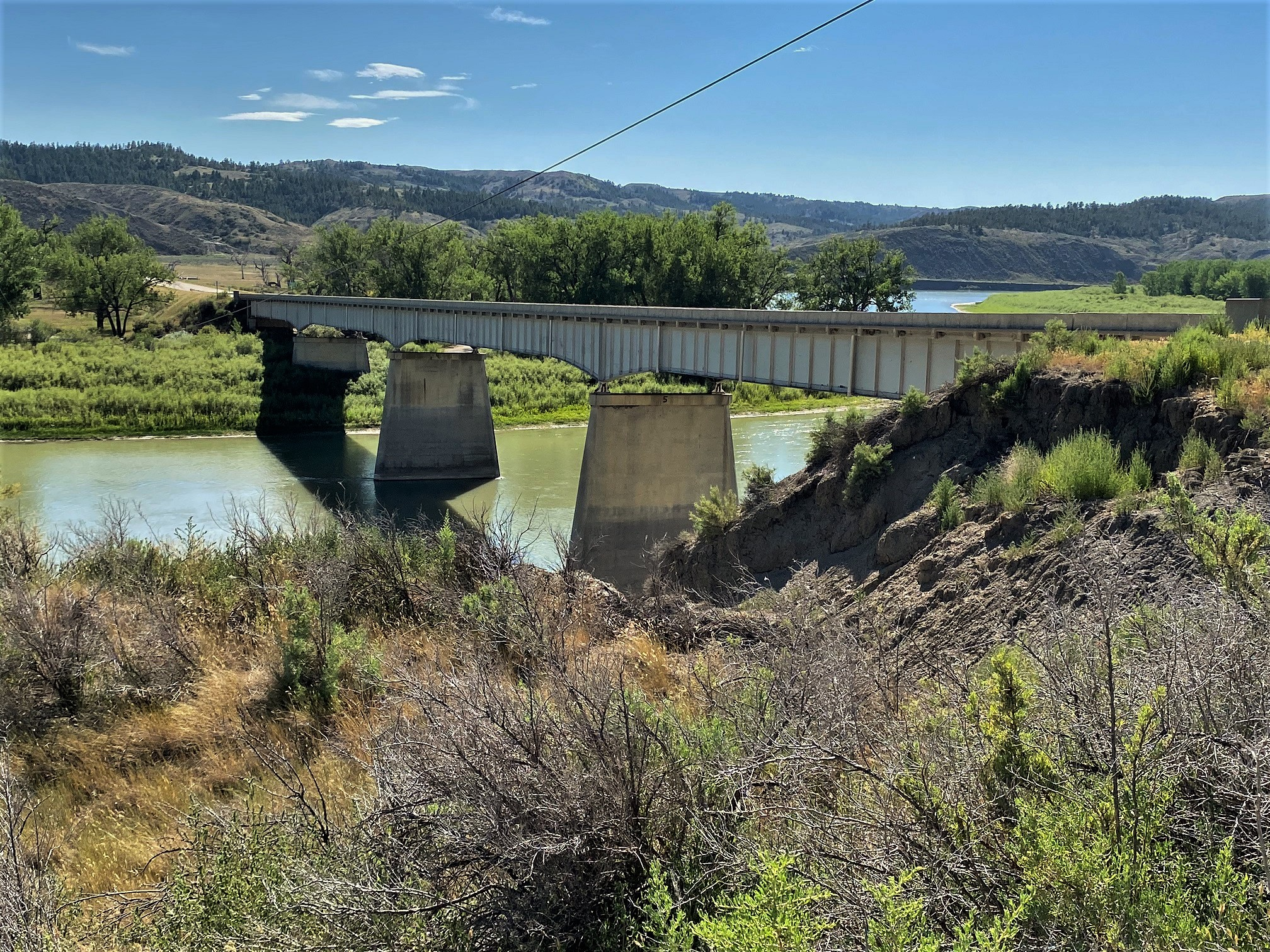

- Location within Montana Location within the United States
- Location: Milepost 88, US 191, 51 miles (82 km) north of Lewistown, Montana
- Coordinates: 47°37′51″N 108°41′6″W
- Area: Upper Missouri River Breaks National Monument
- Built: 1959
- NRHP reference No.: 12000171
- Added to NRHP: March 26, 2012

The Fred Robinson Bridge in Montana is a four-span steel-girder bridge over the Missouri River between Fergus County and Phillips County that was listed on the National Register of Historic Places in 2012. It is the "best documented" bridge in Montana and is "magnificent", according to its NRHP nomination. Construction of the bridge was controversial; it is named for Montana state senator Fred Robinson, "one of the bridge’s most aggressive and active proponents".

It was included in the "Montana's Steel Stringer and Steel Girder Bridges" Multiple Property Submission.
