= Havre Residential Historic District =

Historic district in Montana, United States

- U.S. National Register of Historic Places
- U.S. Historic district
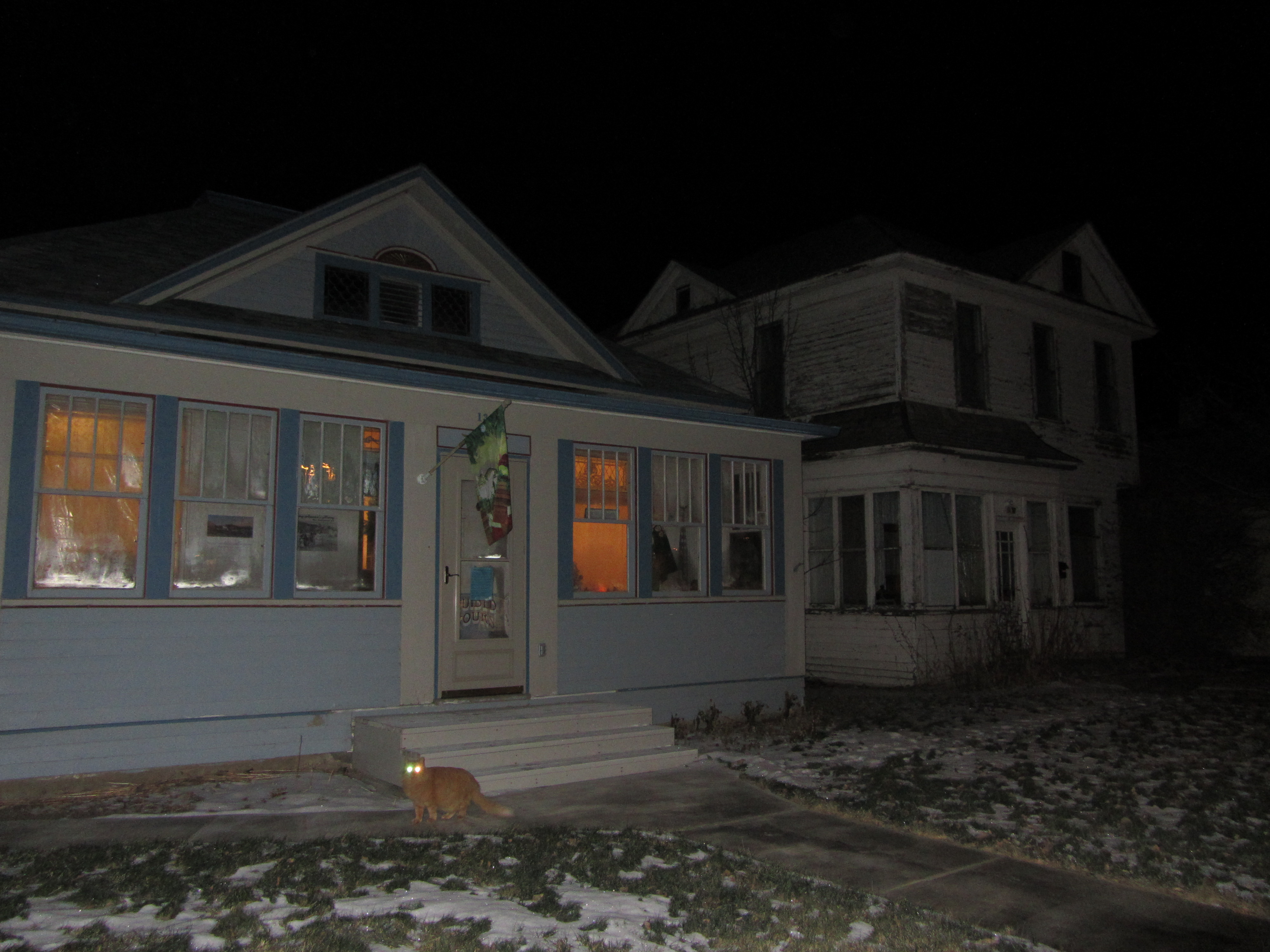
- The High Line Heritage House Museum

- Location within Montana Location within the United States
- Location: Roughly bounded by 3rd St., 7th Ave., 11th St., 5th Ave., 10th St., 3rd Ave., 7th St., and 1st Ave., Havre, Montana
- Area: 110 acres (45 ha)
- Architect: Multiple
- Architectural style: Colonial Revival, Queen Anne, Bungalow/craftsman
- NRHP reference No.: 89001630
- Added to NRHP: October 5, 1989

The Havre Residential Historic District is a site on the National Register of Historic Places encompassing 36 blocks in Havre, Montana.

The Havre Residential Historic District represents Havre's economic growth and social change from 1895 to the 1940s. Located primarily at the district's northwestern edge, turn-of-the-century homes of the social and business elite are large residences built in Queen Anne/Colonial Revival and Neo-Colonial styles. Their owners’ fortunes were made from providing supplies and services to soldiers at nearby Fort Assinniboine, homesteaders, and Great Northern Railway employees. As a railroad division point, Havre became home to white-collar workers who built smaller homes in the district. By 1907, the Craftsman bungalow was the preferred housing style. These smaller, one- or one-and-a-half-story dwellings reflect the security of the middle class in Montana during the first decades of the twentieth century. Havre's establishment as Hill County seat in 1912 coincided with the Progressive political movement that sought clean cities with suitable housing for all. Between 1913 and 1917, the Home Builders Investment Company—created by local Progressives—built more than 100 homes. Post World War I depression dampened construction in the district, but late-1920s railroad expansion caused a housing boom. Homes subsequently built here during the Great Depression utilized lower-cost materials and simpler designs.

== Contributing properties ==
=== Boone/Dalrymple House (132 3rd Street) ===
The sunburst motif on the front gable end of this single-story, hipped-roof residence signals the builder's debt to the Queen Anne style. Havre pioneer Daniel H. Boone and his wife, Elizabeth, owned the four-square residence. Built before 1903 and perhaps as early as 1892, it is among Havre's older homes. The technologically advanced Boones installed a telephone in 1903 and indoor plumbing in 1906. Boone owned a drug store on Third Avenue, an easy three-block walk from here. The store burned in the devastating 1904 fire that destroyed over 90 percent of downtown. Boone's fortunes, like those of most Havre businessmen, rose from the ashes. By 1910, he was selling prescriptions and sundries from a brick business block that graced the same corner as his old wooden store. The home's longest-term residents were dentist Sidney Dalrymple and his wife, Alma, who purchased the property in 1929. Likely responsible for updating the exterior by enclosing and adding Craftsman-style windows to the original front porch, the Dalrymples lived here until their deaths, Sidney's in 1983 and Alma's in 1995.

=== Carlin House ===
There was no sign of the impending Great Depression in January 1929. Havre had spent half a million dollars on construction the year before, and the future looked bright. Among those kept busy by Havre's growth was prolific local builder Christ Fuglevand. Fuglevand, who built over fifty homes in Havre, constructed this single-story stucco residence in 1929 for an estimated $4,550. The house featured Craftsman-style detailing, including a low-pitched roof with wide overhanging eaves, exposed rafter tails, and a half-length porch with massive wood and cobblestone porch supports. Dan Carlin, a yardmaster for the Great Northern Railway, and his wife Clara were the home's first owners. The couple rented the daylight basement apartment for $60 a month to a dry goods store manager and his family. An increasingly common feature in Havre after 1929, such apartments frequently provided housing for students attending the Northern Montana School. This precursor to MSU-Billings was founded in 1929.

=== Crosson-VanBuskirk Home (436 4th Avenue) ===
Prominent builder Abe Crosson acquired this property in 1911. By 1916, a booster brochure proclaimed the frame Colonial Revival residence one of Havre's beautiful homes. In 1936, Great Northern Railroad conductor Ray VanBuskirk and his Irish-born wife, Marie, purchased the residence, establishing a home that has since spanned three generations. Their son, Warren, a railroad dispatcher, brought his Italian-American wife, Edith, to live here in 1948. Warren and Edith, offspring of Havre's rich ethnic population and railroading tradition, together raised five children in the home.

=== Lou Lucke Sr. House (900 3rd Avenue) ===
The quintessential businessman, Lou Lucke arrived in Havre in 1903, where he founded a shoe repair and later a clothing store and a dry cleaning business. He also speculated in real estate. When the homestead boom in turn boomed Havre, Lou and local contractor Cassius Taylor developed Havre's Lucke-Taylor Addition, where Lou and his wife, Harriet, lived in this 1914 Craftsman style bungalow. Designed by Havre architect Frank Bossout, who also designed Hill County Courthouse, the home cost approximately $5,000 to build. The interior features Italian marble and oak woodwork. The Luckes raised five children here, surrounded by family. Harriet's mother lived two doors down, and Lou's brother lived next door to her. When they came of age, Lucke sons Alvin, Louis, and Neal also built homes in the neighborhood on lots given them by their father. Harriet lived in this house into the 1970s, when she sold the home to a grandson and moved next door to the smaller, more manageable house originally built by her son Neal. She lived there until her death in 1981.

=== John H. Mathews House (124 3rd St.) ===
Distinguished by its bell-cast porch roof, scalloped shingles decorating the front dormer, and classical columns on the front porch, this wood-frame home was built during the Victorian era, sometime between 1892 and 1903. John Mathews, an agent for the Great Northern Express Company, owned the home by 1910. He and his wife, Kathryn, had eight children, only six of whom survived young childhood. The family supplemented its income by taking in boarders, a barber and two of John's coworkers. Two live-in servants helped Kathryn run the house: Mary Daniels, a forty-two-year-old divorced woman, and Paul Tayimo, a twenty-two-year-old Japanese man. Tayimo was one of over 1,500 Japanese immigrants living in Montana in 1910, most of whom originally worked for the railroads. Kathryn died in 1915, and like most widowers left with large families, John remarried. In 1920, he and Rena, his second wife, lived here with a servant and all six Mathews children, whose ages then ranged from twenty-three to ten.

=== St. Mark's Episcopal Church (539 3rd Avenue) ===
Havre's first Episcopal church service was held in 1900 at Fort Assinniboine, south of Havre. After the arrival of the Reverend Leonard J. Christler in 1907, regular services were conducted in town. The Reverend Christler immediately began plans for a permanent church, and groundbreaking took place the following year. Distinguished Kalispell architect Marion B. Riffo drew the blueprints for this beautiful Gothic style building. Constructed of donated granite from Helena, shipped by rail free of charge, the church was finally completed in 1918. Its elegant and distinctive features include a crenellated tower and carillon, graceful arched windows, and stained glass.

=== A. D. Smith House (202 Third Street) ===
Alexander “Nosey” D. Smith came to Havre as a Great Northern Railroad conductor when the first trains came through town in the mid-1890s. He purchased two lots for $5 in 1897 and built this late Victorian Folk style home in 1902. Multi-light windows and the steeply pitched roof with rolled edges are reminiscent of an English cottage while Craftsman style elements include the tapered front columns. Inside, oak stair treads become pine as the stairway turns the corner. This may seem an expression of thrift, but the upstairs fixtures are silver. Smith, noted for his own beautifully kept yard, served several terms as street commissioner, transforming Havre's streets from irregular, unsightly lanes into boulevards. He also installed both styles of the town's first streetlights. Smith's wife, Jennie, gave voice lessons and the couple had one son, Harry. Smith died in 1915. In 1926, Jennie sold the house to Dr. Arthur Husser and his wife, Rae. Dr. Husser's surgical practice was on First Street and his wife was a nurse at the Havre Clinic.
