= McCormick's Livery and Feed Stable Sign =

- U.S. National Register of Historic Places
- Location within Montana Location within the United States
- Location: Townsend, Montana
- Coordinates: 46°19′06″N 111°37′43″W
- Architectural style: Work of art
- NRHP reference No.: 81000339
- Added to NRHP: July 8, 1981

The McCormick's Livery and Feed Stable Sign is a site on the National Register of Historic Places located in Townsend, Montana, United States. It was added to the Register on July 8, 1981. The sign is 8X15 feet on a limestone wall. It reads "The Best in Town, McCormicks Livery and Feed Stable, Near Depot - Townsend".
