= Stockmen's Bank of Martinsdale =

- U.S. National Register of Historic Places
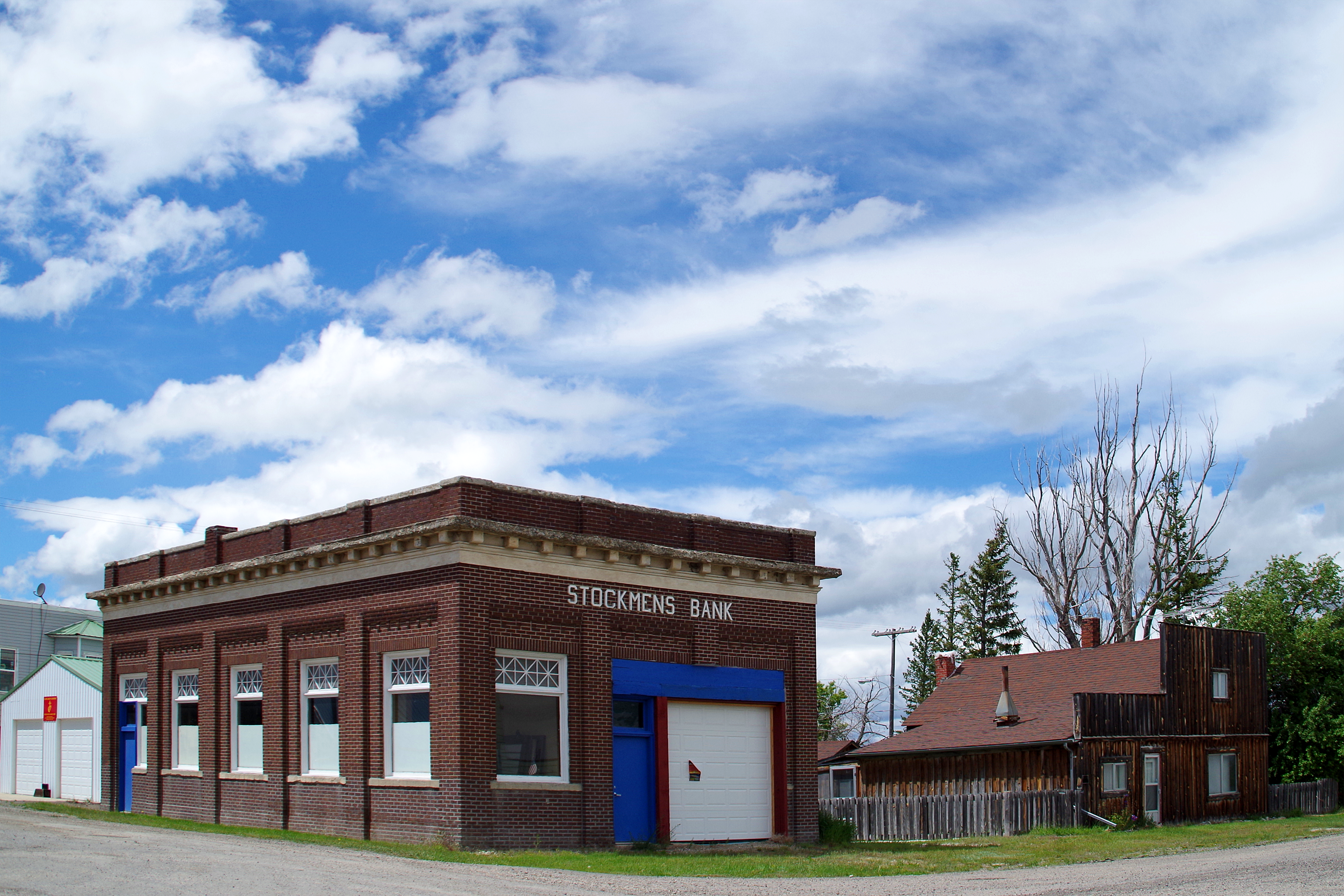

- Location within Montana Location within the United States
- Location: 9 Main St., Martinsdale, Meagher County, Montana
- Coordinates: 46.458629°N 110.315095°W
- Area: less than one acre
- Built: 1919
- NRHP reference No.: 13000224
- Added to NRHP: May 1, 2013

The Stockmen's Bank of Martinsdale, at 9 Main St. in Martinsdale in Meagher County, Montana, was built in 1919. It was listed on the National Register of Historic Places in 2013.

It was built for the State Bank of Martinsdale, which had been founded in 1909. It operated as State Bank of Martinsdale from 1919 to 1923, when it closed in the post-World War I agricultural depression and banking crisis. Its successor, the Stockmen's Bank of Martinsdale, survived for 26 years including the 1929 stock market crash and the Great Depression, only to be felled in 1949 upon discovery that its cashier, its single employee, had stolen funds over several years. The fraud began in 1936 and was only discovered when the cashier was out due to an illness in 1949.

It is a one-story, approximately 30 by 60 feet (9.1 m × 18.3 m) commercial brick and structural clay tile building on a concrete foundation.
