= Tipi Hills =

- U.S. National Register of Historic Places
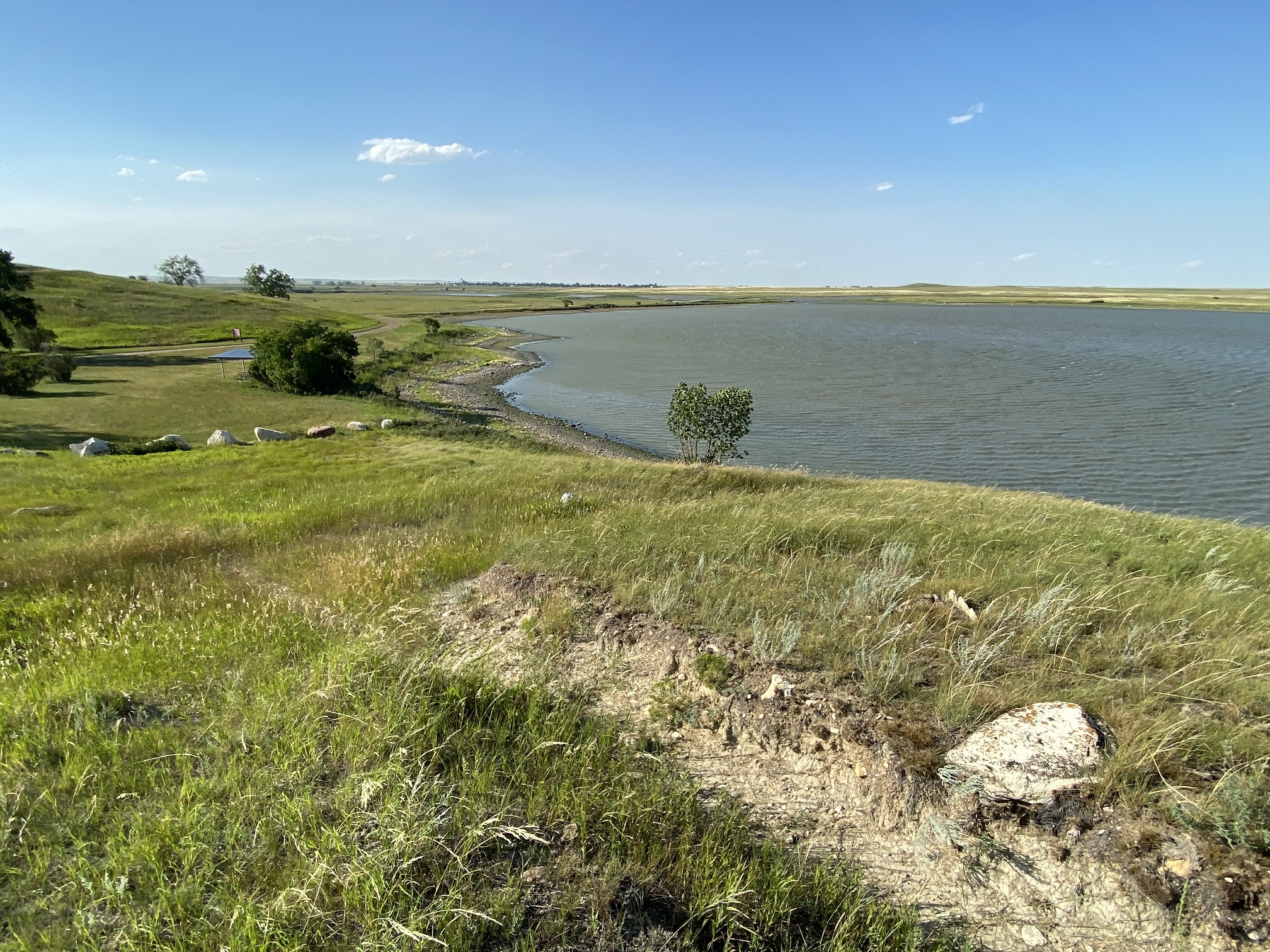
- Nearest city: Medicine Lake, Montana
- Area: 95 acres (38 ha)
- NRHP reference No.: 75001085
- Added to NRHP: August 1, 1975

Tipi Hills is a 95 acres (38 ha) archeological site in Sheridan County, Montana in the general vicinity of Medicine Lake, Montana which was listed on the National Register of Historic Places in 1975. Its location is address restricted. The site was, in prehistorical times, a camp site.

A 1992 review of context for archeological other historic resources of Sheridan County notes archaic cultures' use of camp sites and buffalo kill sites and other evidence in the area of several U.S. states and Canadian provinces nearby. It notes that two archeological sites in Sheridan County, denoted 24SH659 and 24SH660, include artifacts possibly of former sweat lodges, and that one of these includes artifacts of 13 tipi rings and two hearths.
