= Parberry Block East =

- U.S. National Register of Historic Places
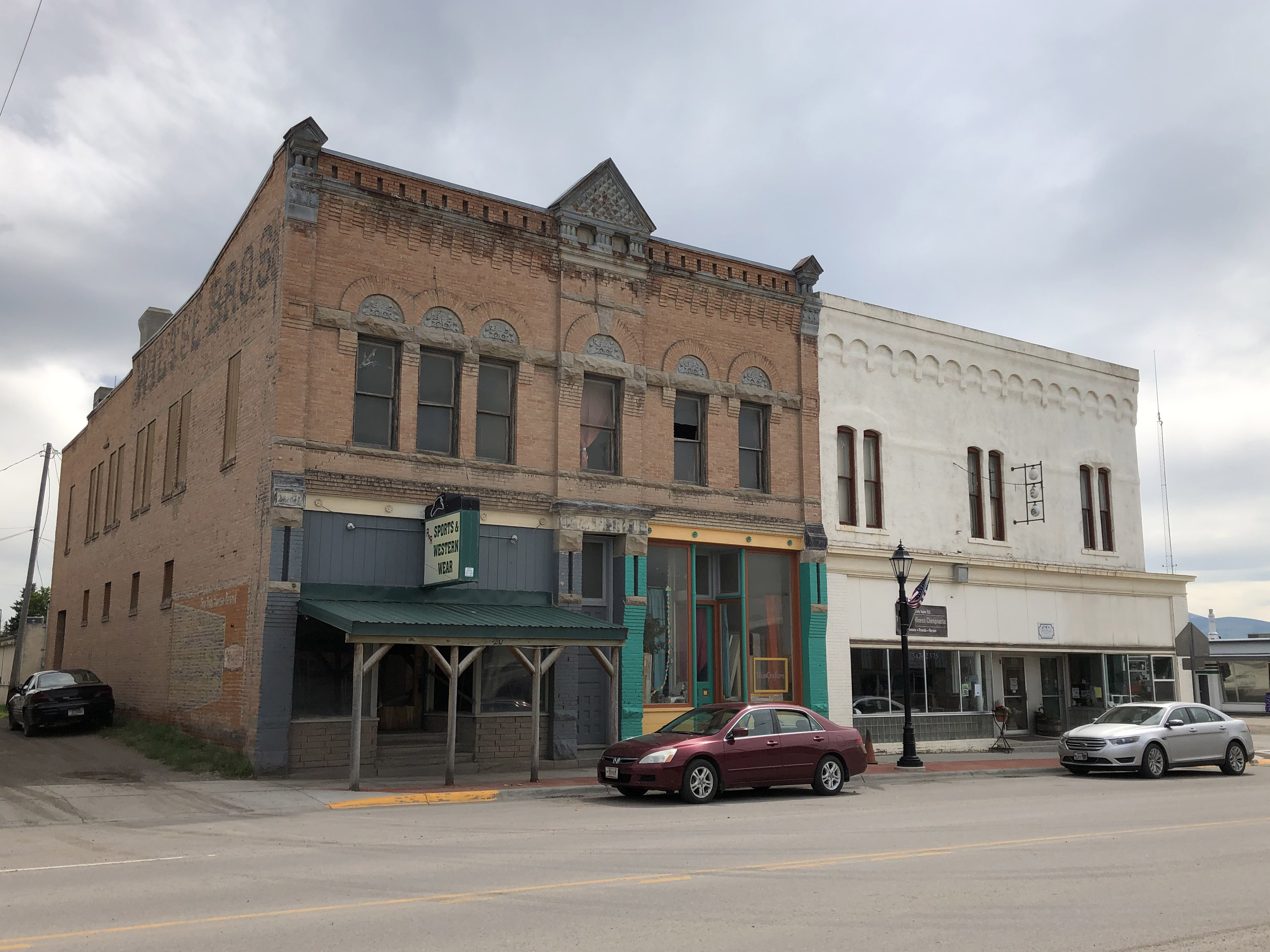

- Location within Montana Location within the United States
- Location: 18–20 East Main Street White Sulphur Springs, Montana
- Coordinates: 46°32′53″N 110°54′11″W
- Area: less than one acre
- Built: 1891
- Architectural style: Romanesque Revival, Western Commercial
- NRHP reference No.: 09000237
- Added to NRHP: April 22, 2009

Parberry Block East is a site on the National Register of Historic Places located in White Sulphur Springs, Montana. It was built in 1891. It was added to the Register on April 22, 2009.

It was deemed significant "for its strong association with the commercial history of White Sulphur Springs during the late nineteenth and early-to-middle twentieth centuries" and also as "a fine example of Western Commercial architecture with Late Victorian Romanesque Revival style details."
