= John Otto Spannring Family Farm =

- U.S. National Register of Historic Places
- U.S. Historic district
- Location within Montana
- Nearest city: Big Timber, Montana
- Coordinates: 45°48′50″N 109°50′48″W
- Area: 2,280 acres (920 ha)
- Built: 1917
- Built by: Spannring, et al.
- Architectural style: Bungalow/craftsman
- NRHP reference No.: 95000145
- Added to NRHP: February 23, 1995

The John Otto Spannring Family Farm, in Sweet Grass County, Montana about 7 miles (11 km) east Big Timber, includes structures dating as far back as 1917. The farm was listed on the National Register of Historic Places in 1995. The listing included three contributing buildings, two contributing structures, and a contributing site on 2,280 acres (920 ha).

The property includes two sections fronting along the northeast side of the Yellowstone River, the longer of which is fertile bottom lands, historically and currently used for hay-making, running for about 1.25 miles (2.01 km) along the river. The farm includes fields, pasture, meadows, coulees and rock outcroppings, on the edge of a broad plateau.

The principal farm house was built in 1920 by John Otto Spannring and his four sons. It is a one-and-a-half-story stone and frame bungalow. It is about 33 by 33 feet (10 m × 10 m) in plan, not including front and rear porches. It was modified in 1924, 1928, the early 1930s, and during 1988 to 1991.
