= Lewis and Clark Bridge (Wolf Point, Montana) =

Bridge in Montana

- U.S. National Register of Historic Places
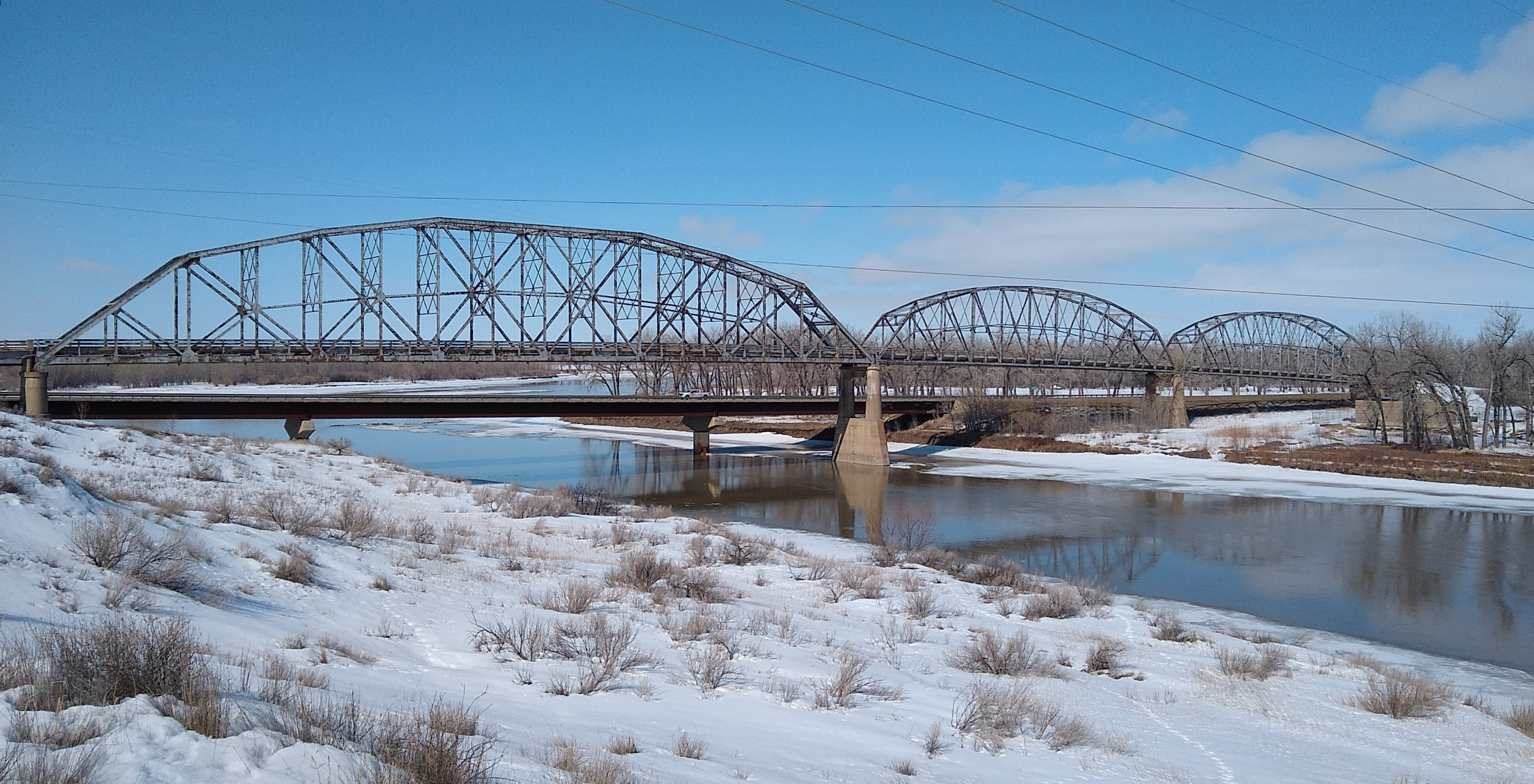
- Lewis and Clark Bridge

- Location within Montana Location within the United States
- Nearest city: Wolf Point, Montana
- Coordinates: 48°4′2″N 105°32′6″W
- Built: 1930; 96 years ago
- Architect: Montana Highway Commission; Missouri Valley Bridge and Iron Co.
- Architectural style: Pennsylvania Through Truss
- NRHP reference No.: 97001451
- Added to NRHP: November 24, 1997

The Lewis and Clark Bridge is a historic bridge in Wolf Point, Montana, which once carried Montana Highway 13 across the Missouri River between McCone and Roosevelt counties. It is also known as Wolf Point Bridge, Missouri River Bridge, or Site No. 24RV438. The bridge is a five-span Pennsylvania through truss; its longest span is the longest through truss span in the state at 400-foot (120 m). Completed in 1930 by the Missouri Valley Bridge and Iron Company, the bridge was the first bridge across the Missouri River at Wolf Point and the only bridge along the river for a 350-mile (560 km) stretch. The bridge's opening ceremony, which took place on July 9, drew over 10,000 visitors and included five bands and a fireworks display. After its completion, the bridge became a popular tourist attraction for motorists in northeastern Montana and a point of civic pride for Wolf Point's residents.

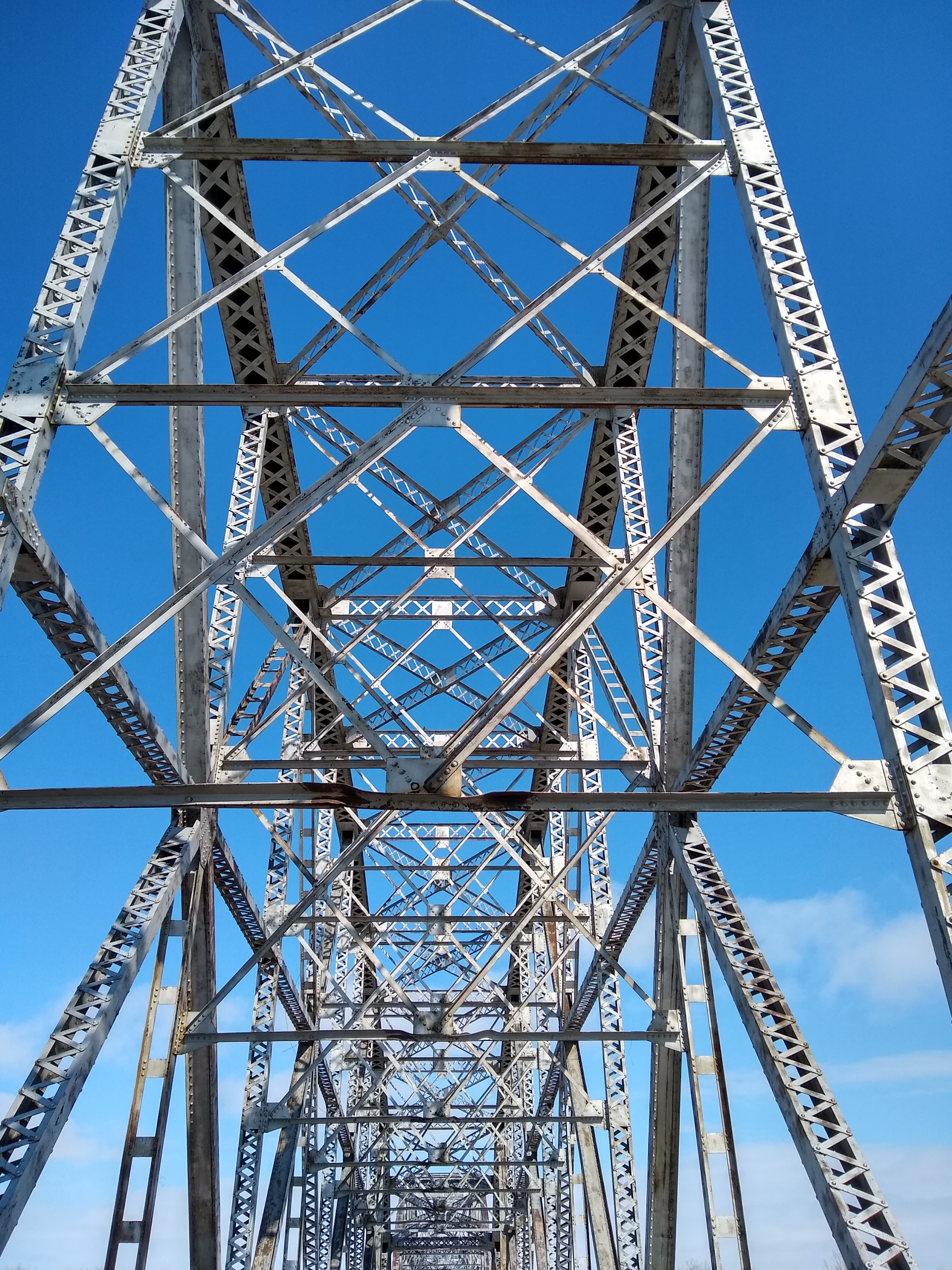
Span of the Lewis and Clark Bridge

The bridge was listed on the National Register of Historic Places on November 24, 1997.

It spans between McCone and Roosevelt counties.

== See also ==
- List of bridges documented by the Historic American Engineering Record in Montana
- List of bridges on the National Register of Historic Places in Montana
