= Wood Lawn Farm =

- U.S. National Register of Historic Places
- Location within Montana Location within the United States
- Location: 5 miles west of Hobson, Montana on Utica Road 239
- Coordinates: 46°59′17″N 109°58′36″W
- Area: 160 acres (65 ha)
- Built: 1890
- Built by: Jellison, Richmond
- Architectural style: Colonial Revival, Queen Anne
- NRHP reference No.: 92001762
- Added to NRHP: January 27, 1993

The Wood Lawn Farm, also known as Goodell Ranch, is a site on the National Register of Historic Places 5 miles west of Hobson on Utica Road 239. It was added to the Register on January 27, 1993. The listing included eight contributing buildings on 160 acres (65 ha).

Its NRHP nomination describes its importance:

... this important historic property symbolizes the transformation of the Judith Basin from open-range prairie lands to farm and ranch lands. The experience of local pioneers, Clarence and Parmelia Goodell, further adds to understanding the settlement and agricultural development of the Basin. Their acquisition of a preemption and a tree claim in 1880 patterns the general trend of homesteaders in the Basin, for a majority of the settlers obtained land from the federal government in this way. Mr. and Mrs. Goodell began to farm and ranch this area as one of the first homesteading families in the Judith Basin. In addition, Wood Lawn Farm is important ... for its architecture. Reflecting a transition away from the primitive log cabin architecture which characterized much residential building on the central Montana ranching frontier, the Goodells built a modern, Queen Anne/Colonial Revival style wood frame house by the beginning of 1890, reflecting a genuine confidence in the Judith Basin and its sustaining capacity. For its associations with local builder Richmond Jellison, the property gains significance. Jellison was responsible for the construction of several vernacular buildings in Philbrook and the outlying rural district, and his sense of design informed the character of this early community.
