= Burgess Garage =

- U.S. National Register of Historic Places
- Location within Montana Location within the United States
- Location: Corner of 3rd and Main, Lambert, Montana
- Coordinates: 47°41′06″N 104°37′15″W
- NRHP reference No.: 04001434
- Added to NRHP: December 30, 2004

The Burgess Garage is a site on the National Register of Historic Places located in Lambert, Montana. It was added to the Register on December 30, 2004. The building is now used as a museum.

The placard reads:

The Burgess Garage was constructed circa 1913 and is the oldest building standing in Lambert. That year the Northwest Improvement Company, a subsidiary of the Northern Pacific Railroad, platted the new townsite. Business at the garage (then called Winkes Garage) was already booming by the time the first train pulled into Lambert in 1914. One of the first sources for motorized vehicles and machinery in Richland County, the garage is a testament to the role mechanization played in the homesteading boom. By 1915, local physician Dr. George Armour had established his practice in the front office while Winkes continued operating his garage in the rear. Winkes died of acute appendicitis in 1918, and his widow sold the garage to Dr. Armour. Armour hired two mechanics and continued to run both his medical practice and the garage from the building, which was renamed Armour’s Garage. Drought, agricultural depression, and depopulation caused many Lambert businesses to close after World War I, including Armour’s garage and medical practice in 1927. In 1931, Alvin Burgess purchased the building from Richland County for $62.00 and reopened the garage, which he operated until his death in 1966. Originally built of wood, the building was covered with stucco early in its history; the one-inch stucco may have protected the garage from a series of catastrophic fires that burned much of Lambert’s business district in 1923, 1925, and 1931. Now owned by the Lambert Historical Society, the building today looks much as it did in the 1920s.
