= Raymond Grain Elevators Historic District =

Historic district in Montana, United States

- U.S. National Register of Historic Places
- U.S. Historic district
- Location within Montana Location within the United States
- Location: Unnamed county road east of Montana Highway 16, northeast of Raymond, Montana
- Coordinates: 48°52′43″N 104°34′39″W
- Area: 6 acres (2.4 ha)
- Built: 1913
- Built by: Ibberson Co.
- MPS: Sheridan County MPS
- NRHP reference No.: 93001148
- Added to NRHP: October 27, 1993

The Raymond Grain Elevators Historic District is a 6 acres (2.4 ha) historic district near Raymond, Montana with six contributing buildings which was listed on the National Register of Historic Places in 1993.

It includes two surviving grain elevators located within the railway right-of-way. Elevator The railway was built in 1913 by the Minneapolis, St. Paul, & Sault Ste. Marie Railroad (the "Soo Line") and was operated by that company until 1990.
