= Comertown, Montana =

- Comertown Historic District
- U.S. National Register of Historic Places
- U.S. Historic district
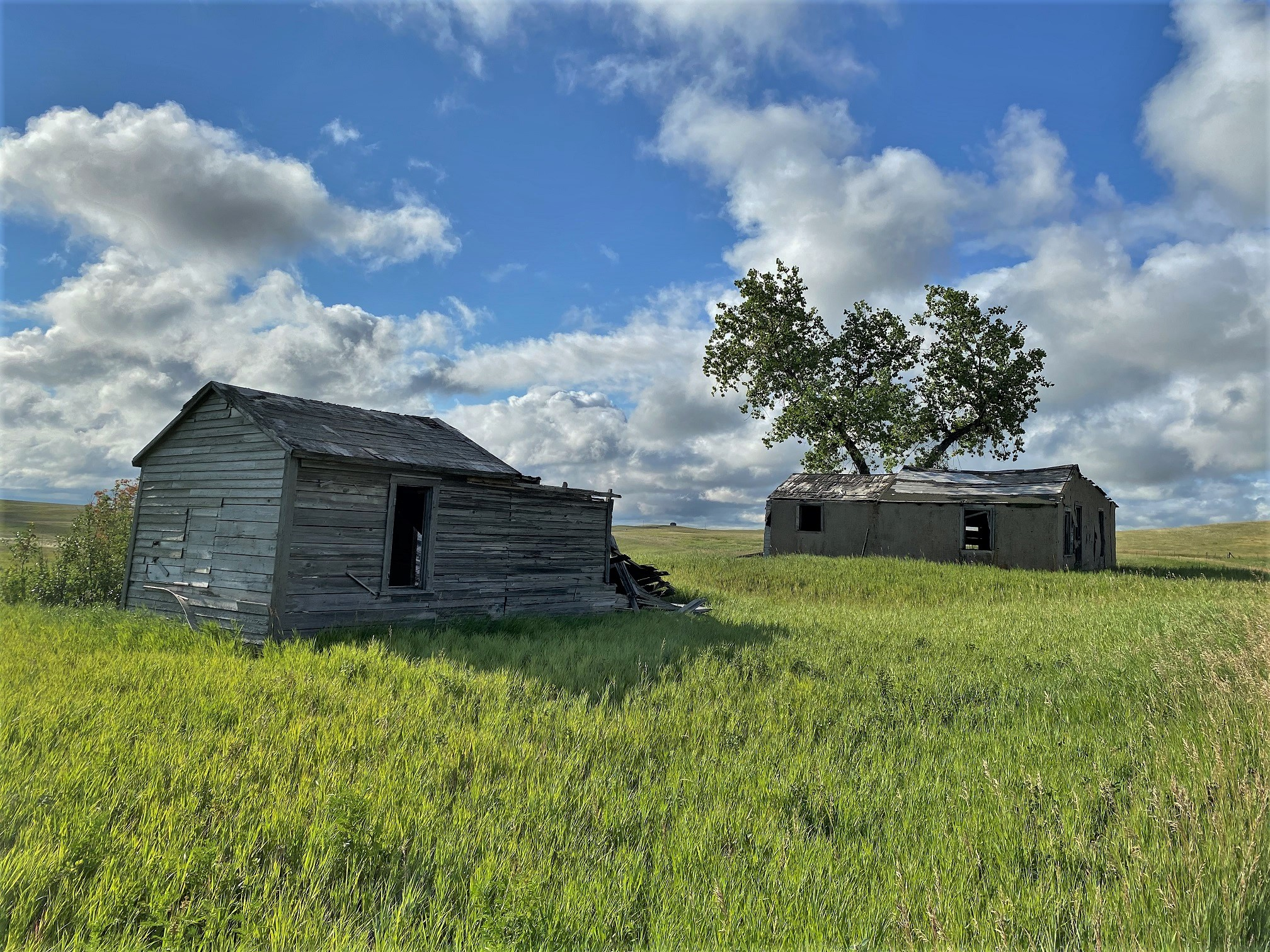

- Location within Montana Location within the United States
- Location: Sheridan County, Montana
- Nearest city: Westby, Montana
- Coordinates: 48°53′49″N 104°14′56″W
- Built: 1913
- MPS: Sheridan County MPS
- NRHP reference No.: 93001149
- Added to NRHP: October 27, 1993

Comertown is an unincorporated community in northeastern Sheridan County, Montana, United States. It was founded in 1913. Comertown is at an altitude of 2,270 feet (692 m).

Although the land around Comertown attracted numerous homesteaders during the first years following the railroad's completion, the region proved to be unsuited for intensive agricultural use, and by the 1920s Comertown was in decline.

The post office at Comertown operated from November 14, 1914, to June 30, 1957. A school and a cemetery were also established at Comertown.

In 1993, the entire community was listed on the National Register of Historic Places as a historic district.
