= Grand Hotel (Big Timber, Montana) =

Historic place in Montana, United States

- U.S. National Register of Historic Places
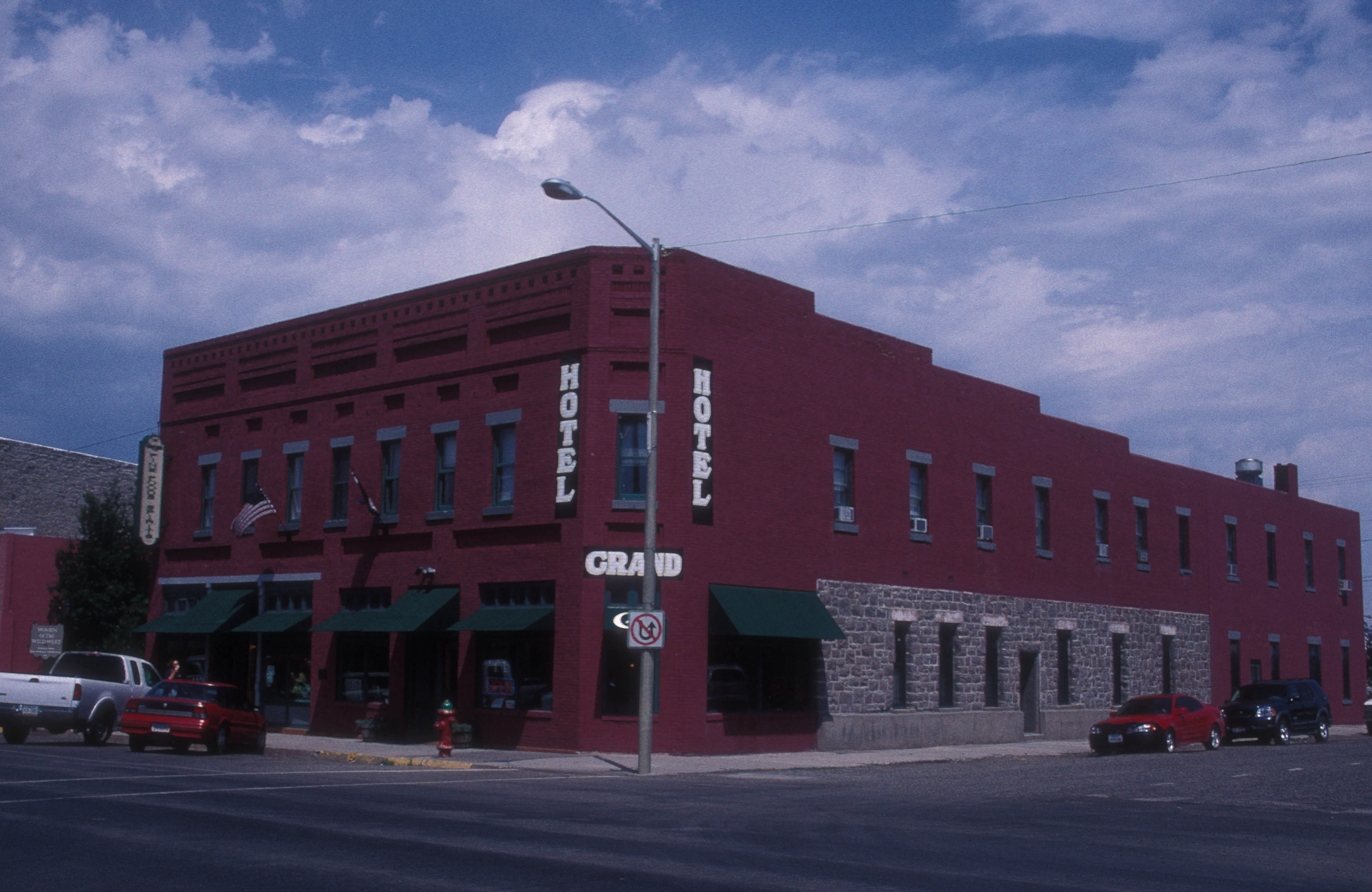

- Location within Montana Location within the United States
- Location: 139 McLeod St., Big Timber, Montana
- Coordinates: 45°50′4″N 109°57′14″W
- Area: less than one acre
- Built: 1890
- Built by: Halverson, Jacob
- NRHP reference No.: 85002424
- Added to NRHP: September 19, 1985

The Grand Hotel in Big Timber, Montana, located at 139 McLeod, was built in 1890. Its building was financed by Jacob Halverson, a Sweet Grass County sheep rancher.

It was listed on the National Register of Historic Places in 1985. It was deemed significant "as an important center for social and commercial activity in Big Timber", a wool exporting community. A fire in 1908 destroyed most businesses along McLeod Street but not the Grand Hotel.
