= Kiwanis Meeting Hall =

Historic building in Havre, Montana, US

- U.S. National Register of Historic Places
- Location within Montana Location within the United States
- Location: 17863 Beaver Creek Rd.
- Coordinates: 48°17′32″N 109°39′51″W
- Area: less than one acre
- Built: 1933
- Architectural style: Rustic
- NRHP reference No.: 10000133
- Added to NRHP: March 31, 2010

The Kiwanis Meeting Hall, also known as Kiwanis Chapel, is a site on the National Register of Historic Places located near Havre, Montana. It was added to the Register on March 31, 2010. The Kiwanis Meeting Hall is within Kiwanis Camp, located in Beaver Creek Park, the largest county-owned park in Montana.
