= Pierre Wibaux House =

Historic house in Montana, United States

- U.S. National Register of Historic Places
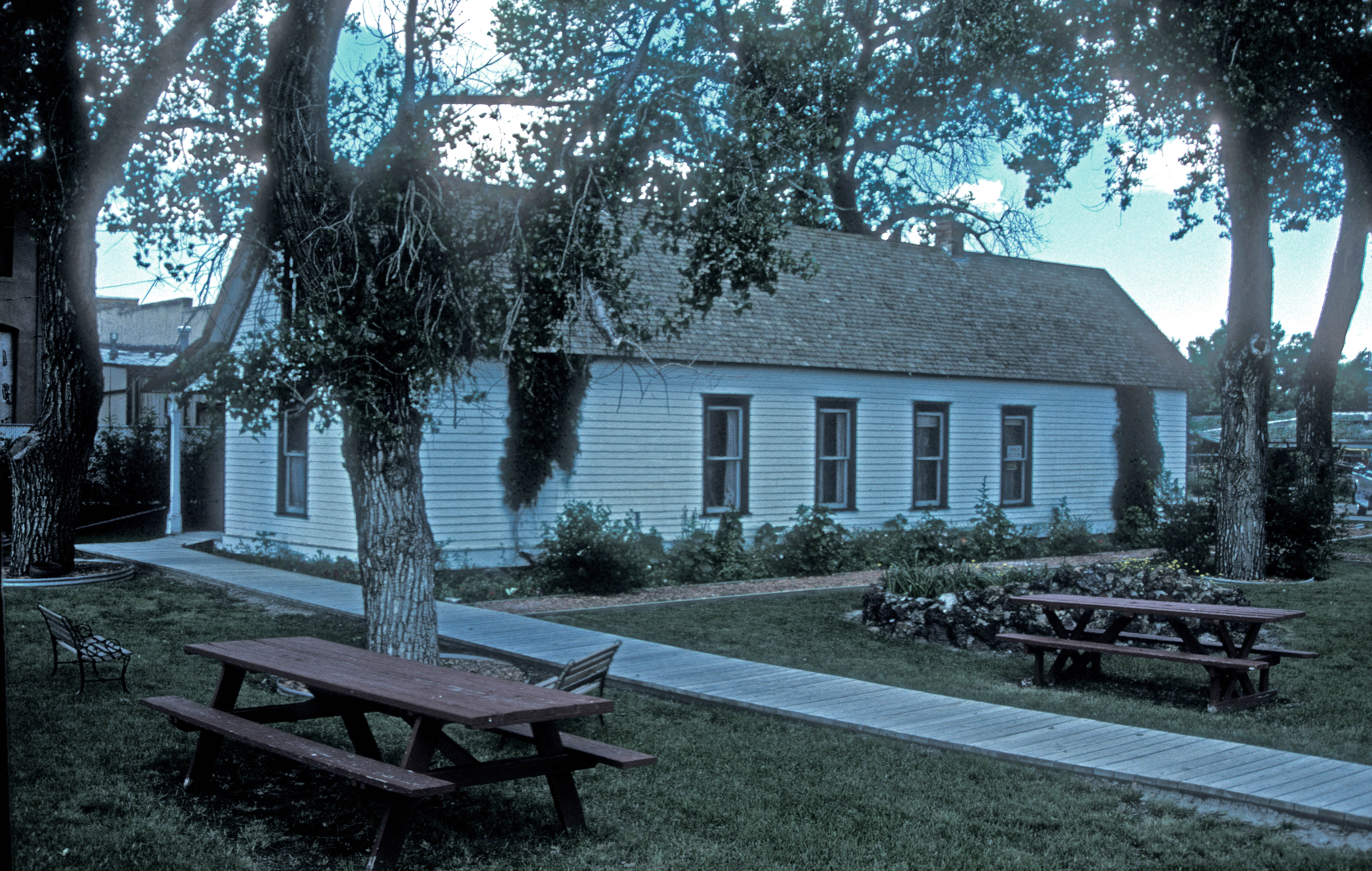

- Location within Montana Location within the United States
- Location: Orgain Avenue; Wibaux, Montana
- Coordinates: 46°59′12″N 104°11′06″W
- Area: 0.5 acres (0.20 ha)
- Built: 1892
- Architectural style: Late Victorian
- NRHP reference No.: 71000483
- Added to NRHP: September 10, 1971

The Pierre Wibaux House is a site on the National Register of Historic Places located in Wibaux, Montana, United States. It was added to the Register on September 10, 1971.

A placard reads:

Pierre Wibaux, scion of a distinguished French textile family, arrived here at the settlement of Mingusville in 1883, establishing a cattle ranch about 12 miles north. His herds fared well during the devastating “Hard Winter of 1886-1887,” after which he borrowed family money to buy out less fortunate ranchers. By the mid-1890s, his ranch was one of the largest cattle operations in the nation, running about 65,000 head of cattle and 300 of horses. He sold from 3,000 to 9,000 cattle each year. Wibaux and others persuaded the Northern Pacific Railroad to build stockyards here in 1883, and to enlarge them in 1894. Wibaux campaigned to have Mingusville platted and renamed for him, both of which occurred in 1894. Two years previously, he and Henry Boice of the Berry-Boice Cattle Company had built this office/residence. Wibaux soon took it over completely, and used it during the week to oversee his business interests. The building faced north until W. A. Orgain, a local merchant, purchased the property in 1903 and moved the building to the rear and facing west. Originally it was surrounded by a lush park of grass and arbored vines tended by a French gardener, the water for irrigation and two artificial ponds supplied by an elevated tank filled by a windmill.
