= The Coram Hotel =

- U.S. National Register of Historic Places
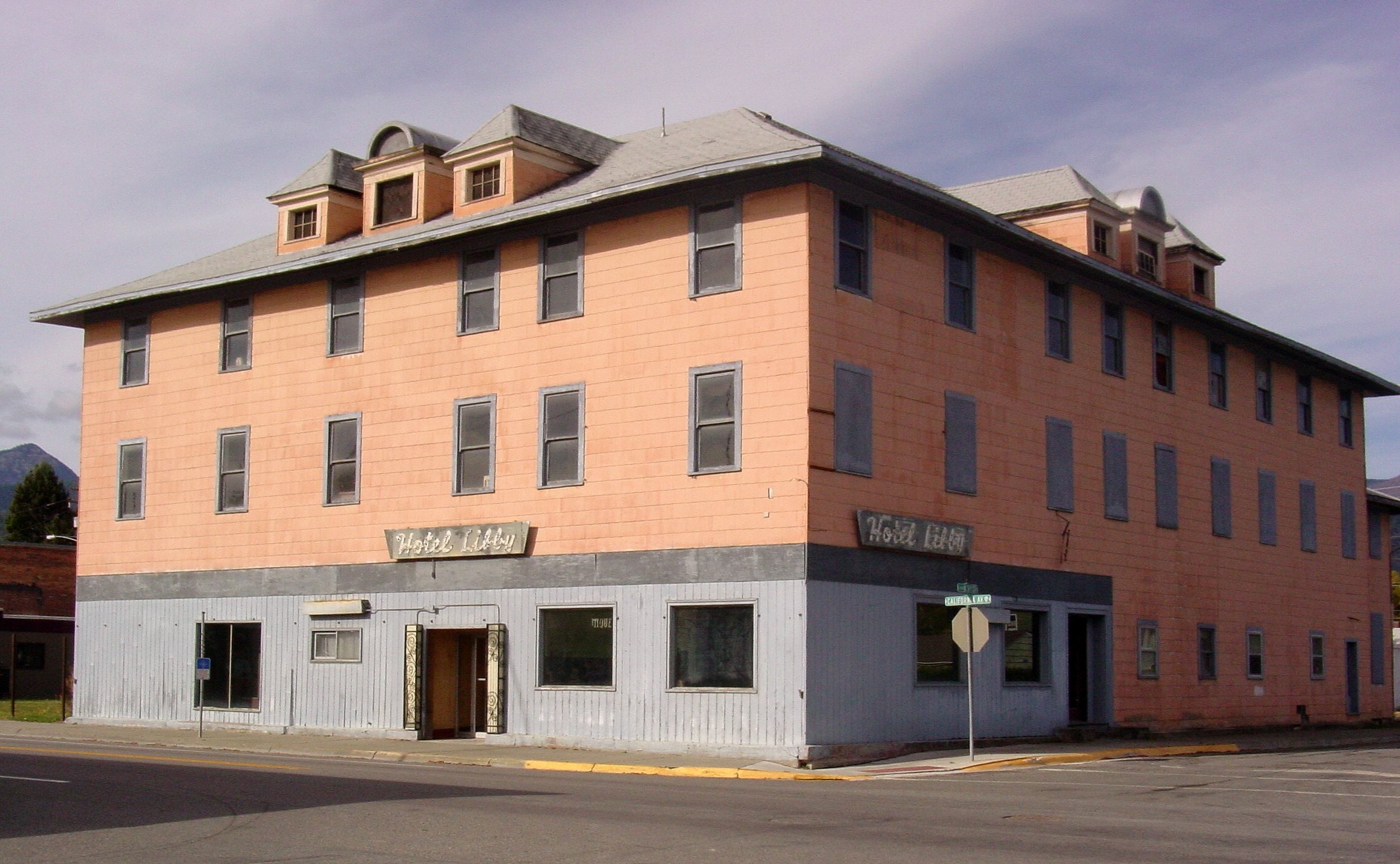

- Location within Montana Location within the United States
- Location: 302 California Ave., Libby, Montana
- Coordinates: 48.393251°N 115.552336°W
- NRHP reference No.: 12000593
- Added to NRHP: September 4, 2012

The Coram Hotel, located on California Ave. in Libby in Lincoln County, Montana, was listed on the National Register of Historic Places in 2012.

It was built as The Coram in 1899 but was left unfinished for 12 years, after the mining industry collapsed. Per a 2012 news article, it was later used to shield cattle during bad weather "and as a town meeting hall when they could shoo the cows out." It was opened as a hotel in 1910 as Hotel Libby.
