= Meadowbrook Stock Farm =

- U.S. National Register of Historic Places
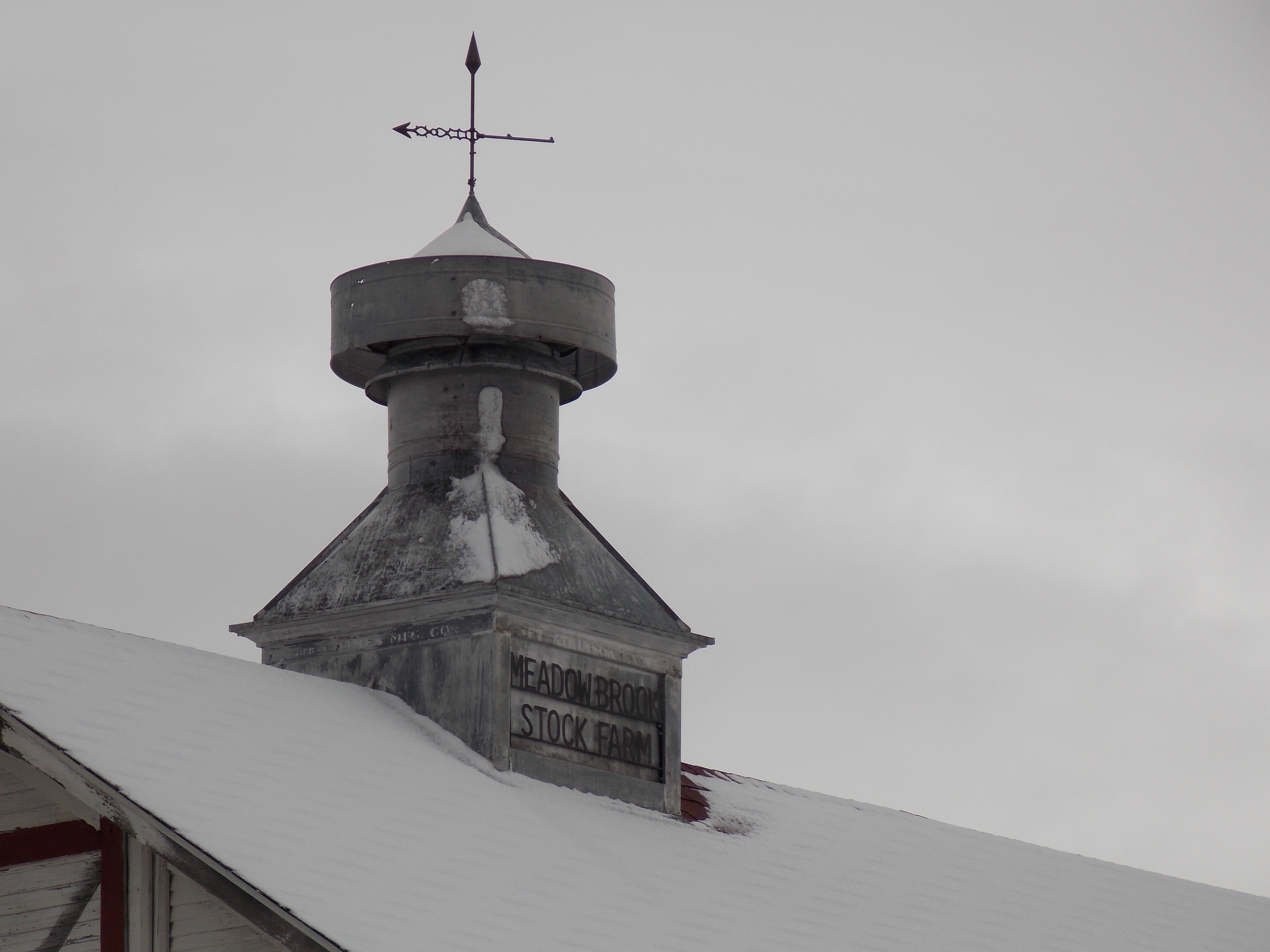
- Barn, 1917

- Location within Montana Location within the United States
- Nearest city: Hobson, Montana
- Coordinates: 47°01′35″N 109°50′57″W
- Area: 20 acres (8.1 ha)
- Built: 1908
- Built by: Murray, Thomas R.
- Architectural style: Classical Revival
- NRHP reference No.: 91001938
- Added to NRHP: January 13, 1992

The Meadowbrook Stock Farm, also known as Thomas R. Murray Ranch, is a site on the National Register of Historic Places located near U.S. Route 87 near Hobson, Montana. It was added to the Register on January 13, 1992.

The main house on the property is a two-story farmhouse built of cast stone in 1908. The blocks were made of concrete cast from molds constructed by Thomas R. Murray, the ranch founder. Mr. Murray was a Scottish immigrant and settled on the site in 1882. Three outbuildings were also built of cast stone, including an ice house, and there are wood frame and post-and-beam buildings as well. The largest barn in Judith Basin County was built in 1917.

Some degree of Classical Revival style is added by an open porch spanning the south and west side of the house, with wooden columns having rounded bases, blocks above their capitals, and open bracket work supporting the porch roof. A second story porch spans the same side of the house.
