= Thornwood School =

- U.S. National Register of Historic Places
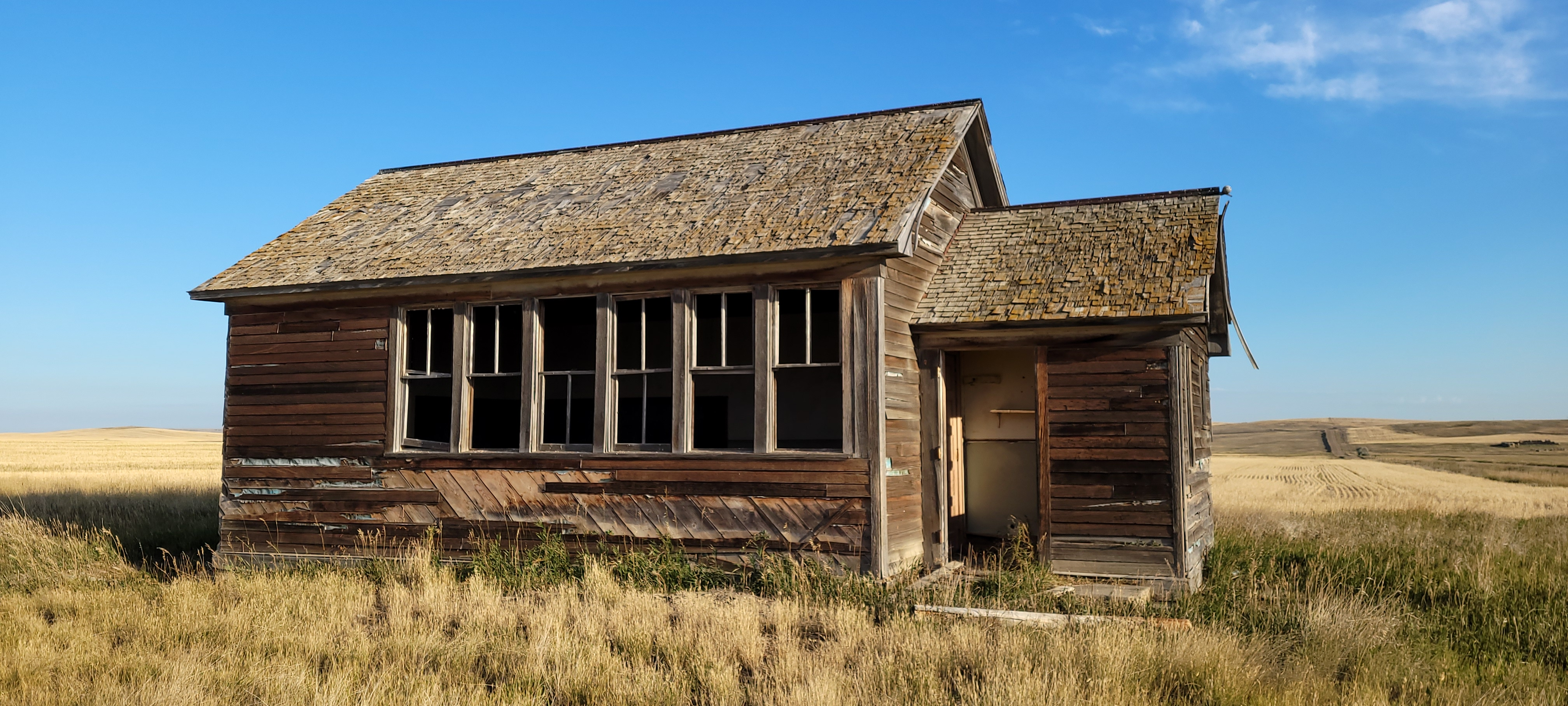
- Thornwood School in 2021

- Location within Montana Location within the United States
- Location: Unnamed county road approximately 17 miles west of Reserve, Montana
- Coordinates: 48°35′34″N 104°47′56″W
- Area: less than one acre
- Built: 1932
- MPS: Sheridan County MPS
- NRHP reference No.: 93001147
- Added to NRHP: October 28, 1993

The Thornwood School, located on a county road about 17 miles (27 km) west of Reserve, Montana, within the Fort Peck Indian Reservation, was built in 1932. It was listed on the National Register of Historic Places in 1993.

In 1993 the one-room schoolhouse had been abandoned for a number of years. It was operated as a school from 1932 to 1946.

== History ==
The Thornwood School was established in the mid 1920s by Sheridan County School District No. 69. At the time, District 69 operated the Wanso School in the next township to the west; presumably a second school was required because new settlement had caused overcrowding of the Wanso School. Designated as District 69A, the Thornwood School was probably also intended for children living just across the county line, as it took on the name of the "Thornwood" ranch located nearby in Roosevelt County. The existing Thornwood School building was apparently constructed in 1932. In October of that year, School District 69 acquired from local Paul and Antinina Andrilenas. The deed recording the transfer noted that the acre was intended for the "...location and operation of a school house and yard..." Additionally, it stipulated that the land was to revert to the Andrilenas family,"... if the schoolhouse is removed there from." The schoolhouse held terms for the next 14 years except for 1941. During this time, it also served as a gathering place for community events such as socials, carnivals, and dances. Its doors were finally shut in 1946, as the region's declining population reduced the rural schools which were necessary. Eventually, School Districts 69 and 69A were consolidated with District 7 in Medicine Lake.
