= Judith River Ranger Station =

- U.S. National Register of Historic Places
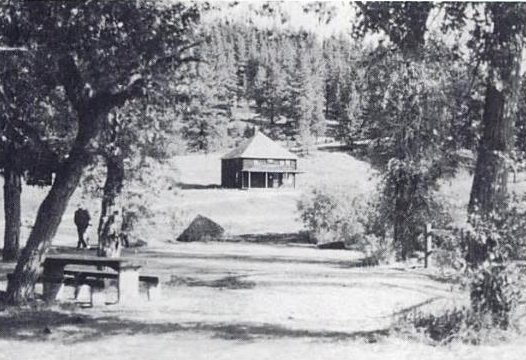
- USFS photo, 1992

- Location within Montana Location within the United States
- Location: along the Middle Fork of the Judith River, southwest of Utica in Lewis and Clark National Forest
- Coordinates: 46°50′51″N 110°17′25″W
- NRHP reference No.: 92000333
- Added to NRHP: April 10, 1992

The Judith River Ranger Station is a site on the National Register of Historic Places located along the Middle Fork of the Judith River, southwest of Utica in Lewis and Clark National Forest. It was added to the Register on April 10, 1992. The location is now used as a campground and the station can be rented as a cabin.
