= Young–Almas House =

Historic house in Montana, United States

- U.S. National Register of Historic Places
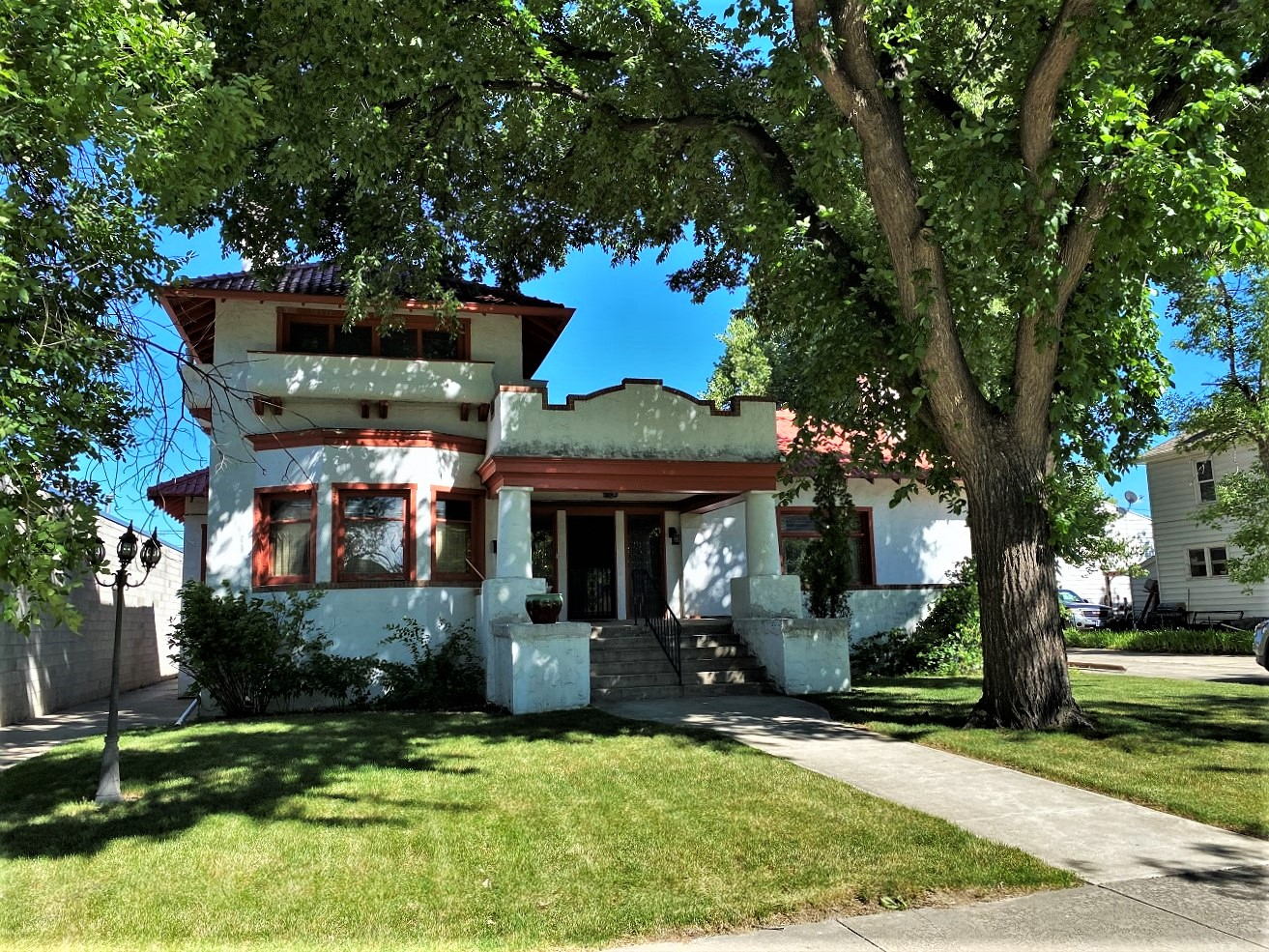

- Location within Montana Location within the United States
- Location: 419 4th Ave. Havre, Montana
- Coordinates: 48°35′29″N 109°40′35″W
- Area: 0.5 acres (0.20 ha)
- Built: 1914
- Built by: Chris Fuglevand
- Architect: Frank Bossuot
- Architectural style: Mission/Spanish Revival
- NRHP reference No.: 80002421
- Added to NRHP: October 14, 1980

The Young–Almas House is a site on the National Register of Historic Places located in Havre, Montana.

It was designed by local architect Frank Bossuot, following photos taken by Mr. Young of a plantation house in Cuba. It was built in 1914 with masonry and terra cotta roofing by contractor Chris Fuglevand. It has also been known as Eliason Funeral Home, which was housed in an addition. It was also added to the Register on October 14, 1980. It is a stucco building in the Spanish Revival style.
