= LaPierre Barn =

- U.S. National Register of Historic Places
- Location within Montana Location within the United States
- Location: Approximately 3.5 miles northwest of Scobey on Tande Ranch Rd.
- Coordinates: 48°50′41″N 105°28′42″W
- Architectural style: Barn
- NRHP reference No.: 05000279
- Added to NRHP: April 11, 2005

The LaPierre Barn, also known as Louis LaPierre's Horse Hotel, is a site on the National Register of Historic Places located near Scobey, Montana, United States. It was added to the Register on April 11, 2005.

It is a large gambrel roofed barn. It is 54 by 84 feet (16 m × 26 m) in plan and 30 feet (9.1 m) tall, built on a slope. Its main gambrel portion was built in 1910, with additions in 1916.
