= Cheever-Cain Ranch =

- U.S. National Register of Historic Places
- U.S. Historic district
- Location within Montana Location within the United States
- Nearest city: Volborg, Montana
- Coordinates: 45°36′47″N 105°55′19″W
- Area: 12 acres (4.9 ha)
- Built: 1905
- Built by: George Cheever
- Architectural style: Vernacular Log
- NRHP reference No.: 10000184
- Added to NRHP: April 13, 2010

Cheever-Cain Ranch is a historic ranch located at 8 Trails End Road in Powder River County, Montana, near the community of Volborg. George and Martha Cheever, along with their daughter Lucretia and her husband Ernest Shy, claimed the land under the Homestead Acts in 1905. George died in 1908, but the rest of the family built a farmhouse and established a ranching operation on the land. The ranch was one of many established in the Pumpkin Creek valley under the Homestead Acts; it also bordered the Custer National Forest, an early attempt to preserve land from overgrazing caused by the multitude of new ranches. After Martha Cheever died, Lucretia and Ernest ran the ranch; Ernest later sold the property to the Cain family, with whom he was close friends.

The ranch was added to the National Register of Historic Places on April 13, 2010.
