= Roundup Central School =

- U.S. National Register of Historic Places
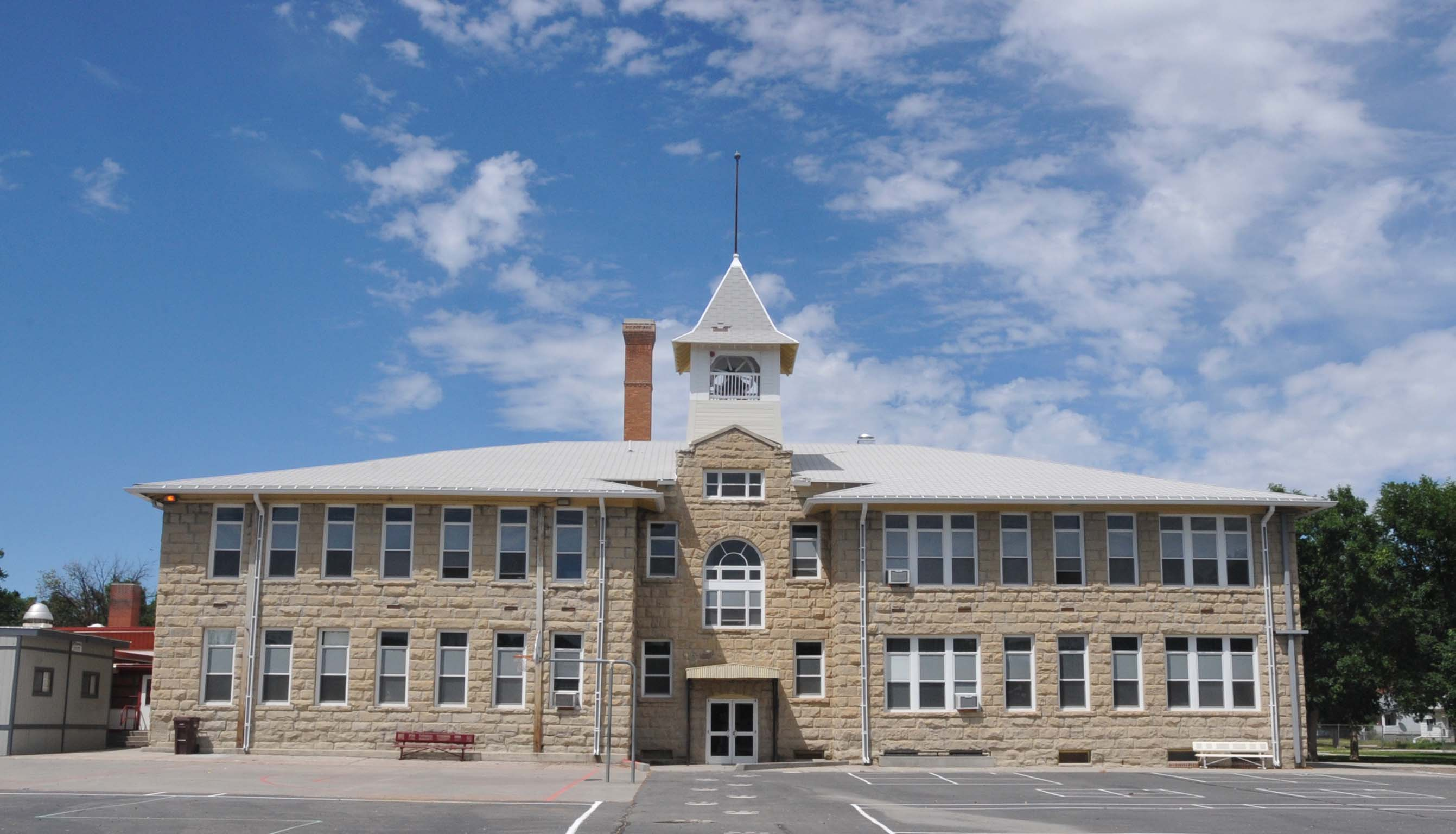

- Location within Montana Location within the United States
- Location: 600 1st St., W. Roundup, Montana
- Coordinates: 46°26′50″N 108°32′37″W
- NRHP reference No.: 07001243
- Added to NRHP: December 6, 2007

The Roundup Central School is a historic school located at 600 1st Street West in Roundup, Montana. The west wing of the school was completed in 1911, while the east wing was completed in 1913. The school was the third building used as a public school in the city; however, it was the first school of considerable size, as the earlier schools had held two and four rooms respectively. The large sandstone building was one of many civic improvements completed in Roundup in the late 1900s and early 1910s, and it served as both a symbol of the city's growth and a sign of its commitment to becoming an established city and regional center. As the region's economy declined due to drought conditions in the late 1910s and 1920s, Roundup's population remained stable due to its status as a regional service center, a role which partly stemmed from the school. As a wave of consolidation closed many nearby schools in the following decades, Roundup both stayed open and absorbed many other districts; it became the largest school district in Musselshell County and cemented its status by absorbing the Klein school district, then the second-largest in the county, in 1959.

The school was added to the National Register of Historic Places on December 6, 2007. It is still used as a school and is one of only two elementary schools in the county.
