= St. Benedict's Catholic School =

- U.S. National Register of Historic Places
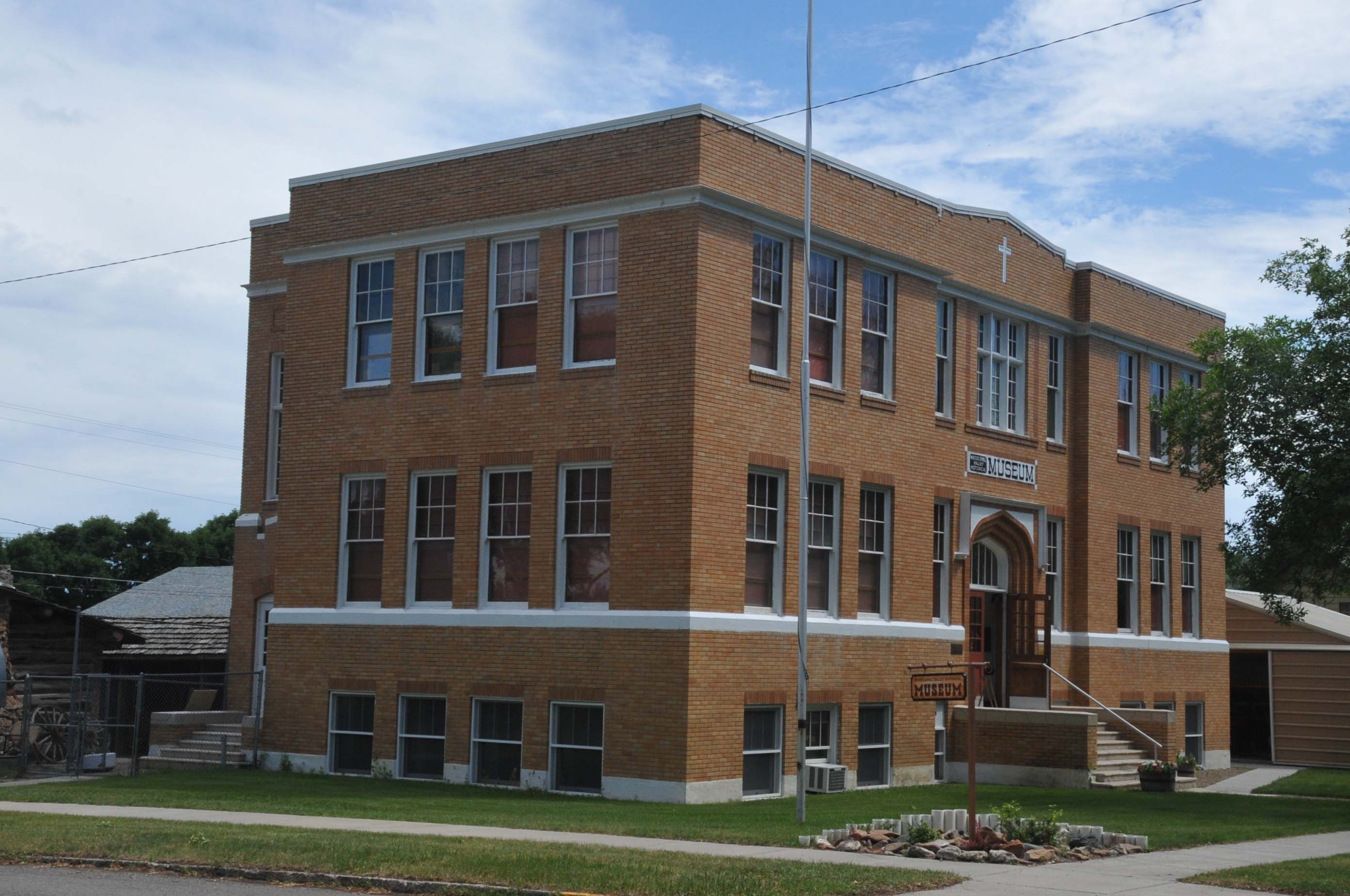

- Location within Montana Location within the United States
- Location: 524 1st St., W. Roundup, Montana
- Coordinates: 46°26′47″N 108°32′33″W
- Built by: Gilbert Gottfrey
- Architect: John H. Grant
- Architectural style: Classical Revival
- NRHP reference No.: 88001120
- Added to NRHP: July 21, 1988

St. Benedict's Catholic School is a historic school building located at 524 1st Street West in Roundup, Montana. The school was built in 1920-21 to serve the children of Roundup's Catholic immigrant community. Coal production, an oil boom, and homesteading all drove economic and population growth in Roundup during the 1910s, and many of the city's new residents were European immigrants. The city's newly established Catholic community built the school toward the end of Roundup's building boom. Architect John H. Grant, who served as the city's only resident architect, designed the two-story brick building. Various groups of nuns served as the school's teachers, with different orders replacing the previous one every few years; when a new order could not be found to replace a departing order in 1950, the school closed for good.

The building was added to the National Register of Historic Places on July 21, 1988. It is currently being used as the Musselshell Valley Historical Museum.
