= Wellman Block =

- U.S. National Register of Historic Places
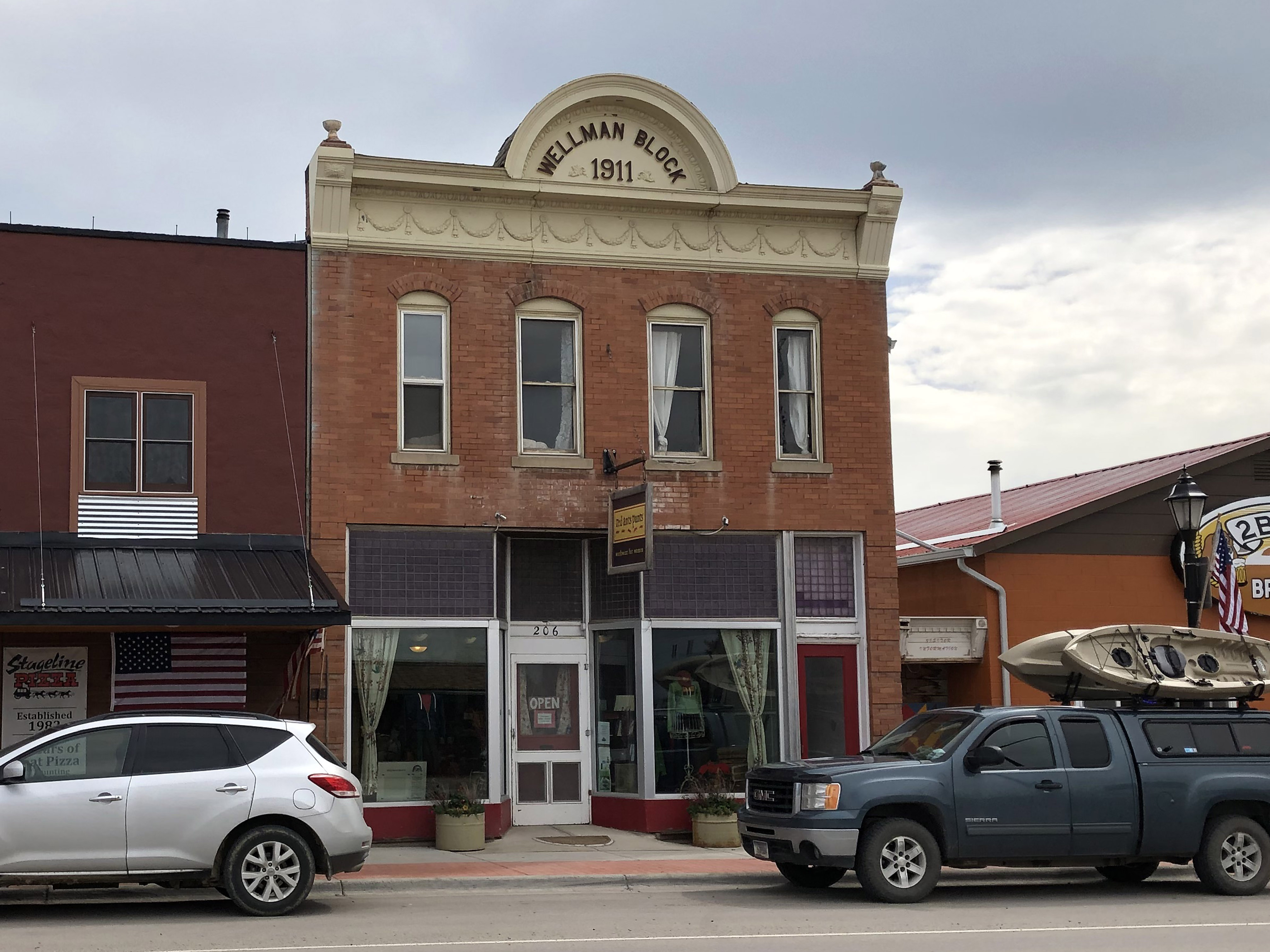

- Location within Montana Location within the United States
- Location: 206 E. Main St., White Sulphur Springs, Montana
- Coordinates: 46°32′52″N 110°54′04″W
- Area: less than one acre
- Built: c.1880, 1911
- Architectural style: Western Commercial
- NRHP reference No.: 94000140
- Added to NRHP: March 7, 1994

The Wellman Block is a site on the National Register of Historic Places located in White Sulphur Springs, Montana. It was added to the Register on March 7, 1994.

It was built c.1880 and was renovated in 1911, perhaps after fire damage. It is a two part commercial building with red brick laid in common bond.

Its 1993 NRHP nomination describes it as "a highly preserved example of popular Western Commercial design, which was common in Montana through the territorial and early statehood years. Embodying several elements of this style, the Wellman Block presents the characteristic brick front to the street while masking a simpler gable roofed mass behind. The symmetrical storefront with recessed entrance, regularly placed double hung windows across the second story and decorative parapet are all common to this treatment."
