= Sanders, Montana =

Sanders
- Unincorporated community
- Location within the state of Montana
- Coordinates: 46°17′29″N 107°5′48″W
- Country: United States
- State: Montana
- County: Treasure
- Elevation: 2,602 ft (793 m)
- Time zone: UTC-7 (Mountain (MST))
  - Summer (DST): UTC-6 (MDT)
- ZIP codes: 59076
- GNIS feature ID: 776208

Sanders is an unincorporated community in northeastern Treasure County, Montana, United States, along the Yellowstone River. It lies along local roads east of the town of Hysham, the county seat of Treasure County. Sanders' post office first opened on March 30, 1904, and closed on October 14, 1905, only to be reopened on December 1, 1906. Although the post office finally closed on July 29, 1994, the community still has a separate ZIP code of 59076.

== Climate ==
According to the Köppen Climate Classification system, Sanders has a semi-arid climate, abbreviated "BSk" on climate maps.

== Education ==
The Sanders School District, established in 1907, closed in 1950. Sanders's students were bused to Hysham.
