= Sand Springs, Montana =

- Unincorporated community
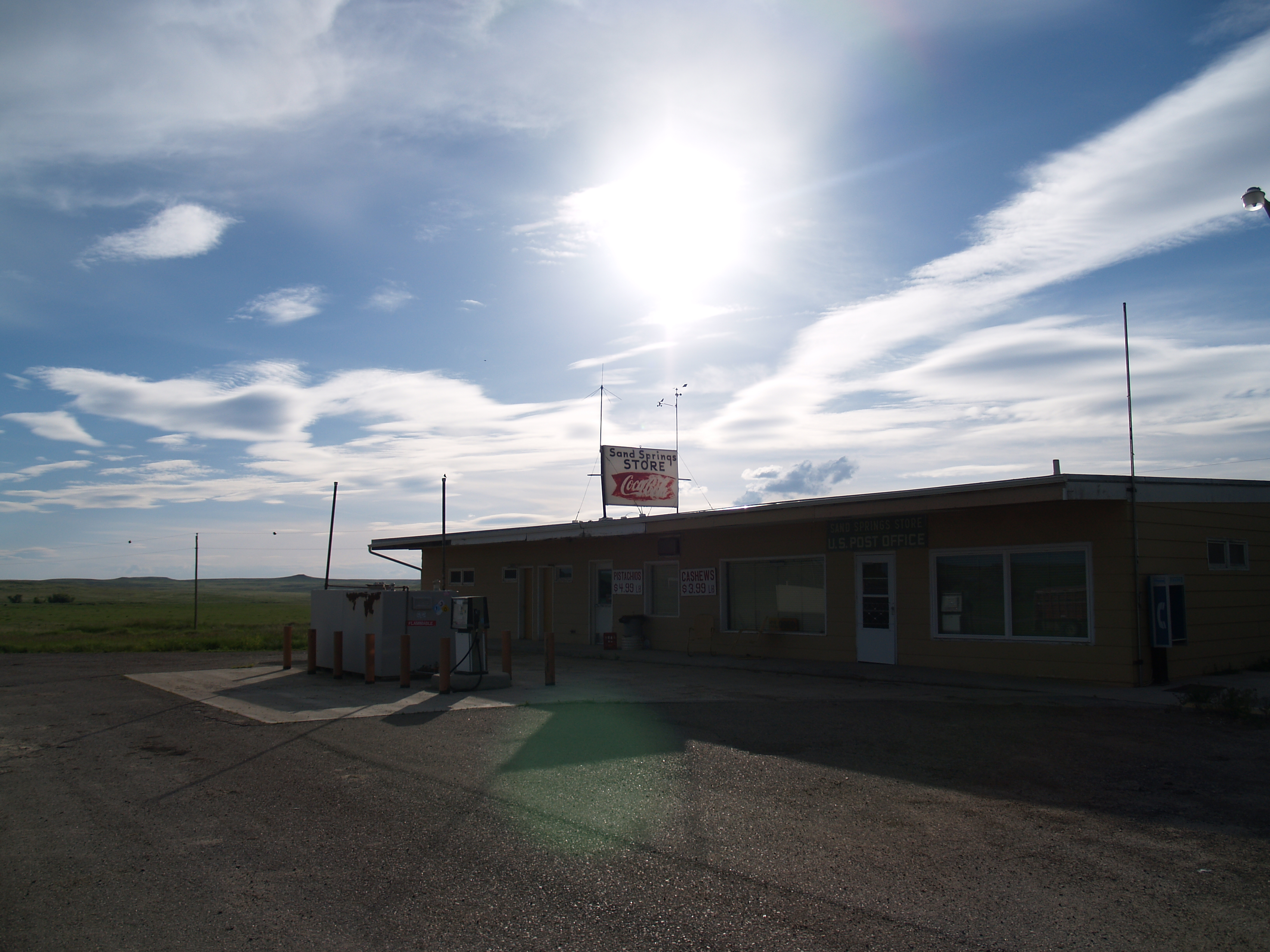
- Sand Springs Store

- Location within Montana Location within the United States
- Coordinates: 47°06′03″N 107°29′08″W
- Country: United States
- State: Montana
- County: Garfield
- Elevation: 3,192 ft (973 m)
- Time zone: UTC-7 (Mountain (MST))
  - Summer (DST): UTC-6 (MDT)
- ZIP codes: 59077
- GNIS feature ID: 776203

Sand Springs is an unincorporated community in southwestern Garfield County, Montana, United States. It lies along the northern side of Highway 200, southwest of the town of Jordan, the county seat of Garfield County. Its elevation is 3,192 feet (973 m).

== History ==
The community has a post office serving ZIP code 59077, which opened on March 1, 1911.

== Climate ==
According to the Köppen Climate Classification system, Sand Springs has a semi-arid climate, abbreviated "BSk" on climate maps.
