= List of public art in Tacoma, Washington =

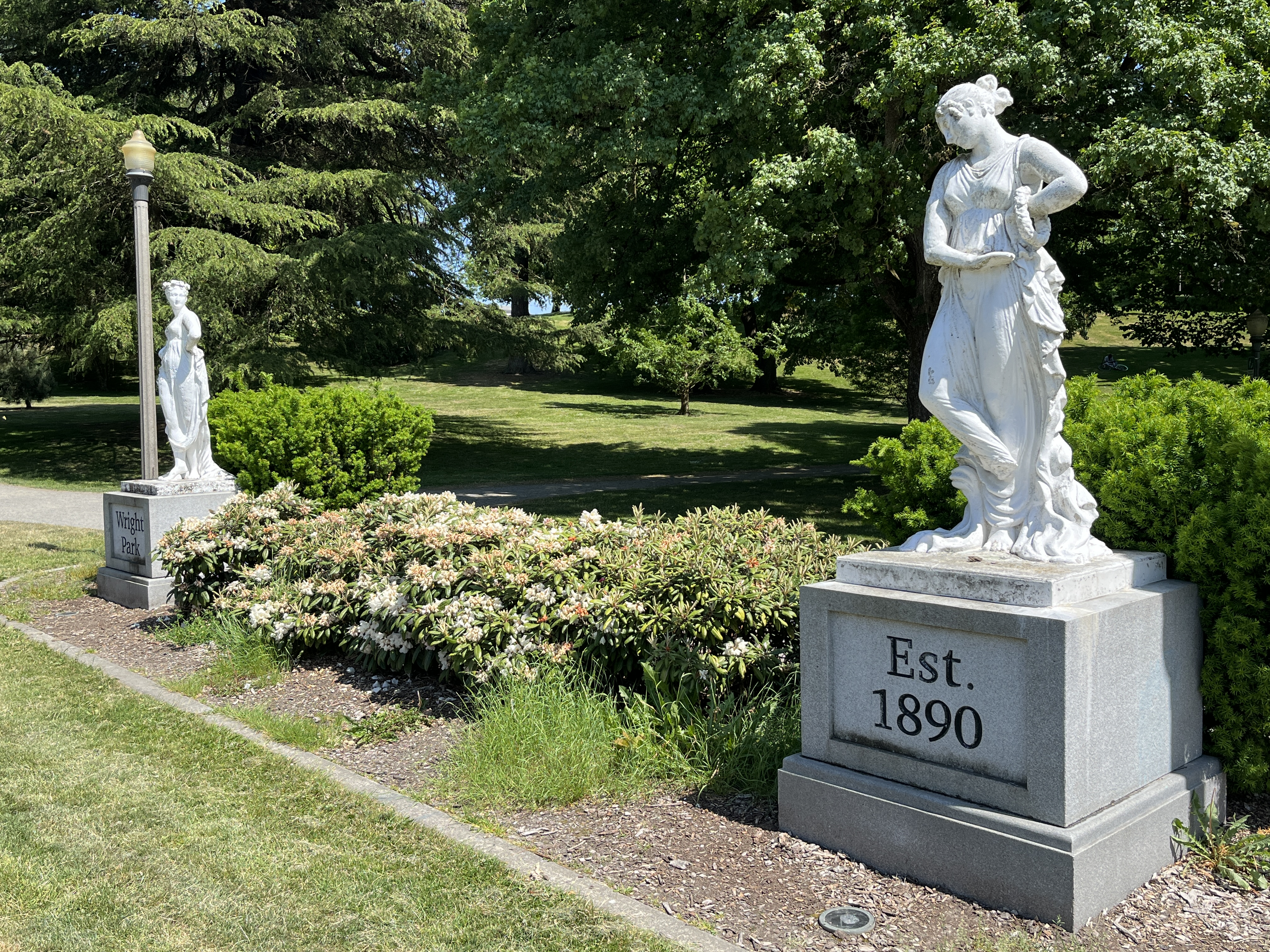
Annie and Fannie, Wright Park, 2023

Notable public artworks in Tacoma, Washington, include:

- Annie and Fannie
- Bust of Henrik Ibsen, Jacob Fjelde
- Fisherman's Daughter
- Goddess of Commerce, Marilyn Mahoney
- Locomotive Monument, Doug Granum
- New Beginnings, Larry Anderson
- Shipment to China, Hai Ying Wu
- Trilogy
