= Goddess of Commerce =

Statue in Tacoma, Washington, U.S.

- The statue in 2023
- Artist: Marilyn Mahoney
- Medium: Bronze sculpture
- Location: Tacoma, Washington, U.S.
- 47°15′29.9″N 122°26′35.8″W

The Goddess of Commerce is a 700-pound, 7-foot tall bronze sculpture installed in Tacoma, Washington. Created by Marilyn Mahoney, the statue is a replica of the 1885 original artwork which "once represented Tacoma's economy" at the former Chamber of Commerce building.

== History ==
The replica was planned for Tollefson Plaza, but was instead erected near the intersections of South Sixth Avenue, South Baker Street, and St. Helens Avenue on August 31, 2011.

As was done to many notable statues at the time, a face mask was placed on the artwork in March 2020, during the COVID-19 pandemic.

== See also ==
- List of public art in Tacoma, Washington
