= E. O. Schwagerl =

American landscape architect

- Born: January 14, 1842; Würzburg, Bavaria
- Died: January 27, 1910 (aged 69); Seattle, Washington
- Occupation: Landscape architect

Edward Otto Schwagerl (January 14, 1842 — January 27, 1910), more frequently referred to as E. O. Schwagerl, (Note: The spellings Schwageral, Schwagerel, Schwaegerl, and O'Schwaigerl are also found, and a small number of sources list his first name as Eugene.) was a Bavarian-American landscape architect who served as Superintendent of Parks for Cleveland, Ohio, and Seattle, Washington. He designed or contributed to the design of a number of cemeteries and parks, including Gordon Park and Riverside Cemetery in Cleveland, Wright Park and Point Defiance Park in Tacoma, Washington, and Denny Park and Kinnear Park in Seattle, and also proposed a master plan for Seattle's park system.

== Life ==
Schwagerl was born to Leonard and Madaline Schwagerl on January 14, 1842, in Würzburg, Bavaria, but lived his early life in Paris, where he was educated by private tutors. At age 12, he traveled alone to New York with plans to accompany his brother on a trip to Costa Rica, but when his brother failed to meet him, he was forced to find work in restaurants and department stores. He began attending the New Hampshire Conference Seminary (now the Tilton School) in Tilton, New Hampshire, at age 19 and considered a career as a minister before deciding against it. He served as an engineer in the American Civil War from 1864 to 1865, after which he returned to Paris for a time. During this second stay in Paris, he assisted an architect who was designing the grounds for the Exposition Universelle of 1867.

Upon returning to the United States, Schwagerl worked for landscape architect Jacob Weidenmann in Hartford, Connecticut for 18 months, helped prepare Weidenmann's book on landscape gardening, and by 1868 was working as an architect in Omaha, Nebraska. He moved several times in the following decade, and in 1870 was working in St. Louis, Missouri before moving his firm back east to Philadelphia, and by 1880 he was living in Cleveland, Ohio. By 1889 he was living in Tacoma and lived either there or Seattle for the rest of his life.

=== Family and personal life ===
Schwagerl was an avid Theosophist who travelled to help set up local Theosophist branches and delivered lectures on topics such as Occultism. He briefly moved to Kingston, Washington, in 1892 with the aim of establishing a Theosophist colony.

He married Ella Varnes in Cleveland in 1883. He filed for divorce in 1892 and accused Ella of having an affair with her uncle, which she denied. Ella alleged cruelty in a counter-claim, prevailed in court, and was awarded custody of their child. In 1894, he married Frances McKay, a fellow Theosophist, to whom he remained married until his death on January 27, 1910.

== Career ==
Schwagerl was responsible for either the original design of or improvements to a variety of public and private parks and buildings throughout his career.

=== Missouri ===
Schwagerl was working in and around St. Louis, Missouri, by 1870. Up the river at Hannibal, he designed the grounds for Mt. Olivet Cemetery, where Mark Twain had his parents and brothers interred a few years later. In 1873, he oversaw improvements to the grounds of the North Missouri State Normal School (now Truman State University). He also worked on the layout of Lindell Boulevard and Vandeventer Place in St. Louis.

=== Ohio ===
Between 1875 and 1876, Schwagerl worked on the design of Riverside Cemetery in Cleveland, on which ground was broken in April 1876. Sufficient progress had been made by that November for the cemetery to be inaugurated in a ceremony that featured guests, among them Schwagerl and President-elect Rutherford B. Hayes, each planting a tree that was dedicated in their honor. His work "was widely regarded as one of the most notable new cemetery designs of the era."

John D. Rockefeller hired Schwagerl in 1880 to survey his property at Forest Hill, and again in 1881 to lay out the grounds and drives of his mansion on Cleveland's Millionaires' Row. During this same period, Schwagerl was working on improving park land belonging to William J. Gordon that was later given to the city and is now known as Gordon Park. Following up his work on Riverside Cemetery, he also helped design a chapel at Woodland Cemetery in 1880.

In 1882, Schwagerl designed improvements to Monumental Square (now Public Square) that included a new stone speakers' platform called the Oratorium, and later that year was commissioned by the city of Cleveland to lay out Wade Park on land willed to the city by industrialist Jeptha Wade. He served as Superintendent of Parks for Cleveland from January 1883 until his resignation in 1884.

=== South Carolina ===
In March 1878, while Schwagerl was living in Philadelphia, the Secretary of State of South Carolina engaged him to design the grounds of the State House, which had remained unfinished due to the Civil War and Reconstruction. His design, in Beaux-Arts style, was implemented by April of the following year.

=== Oregon ===
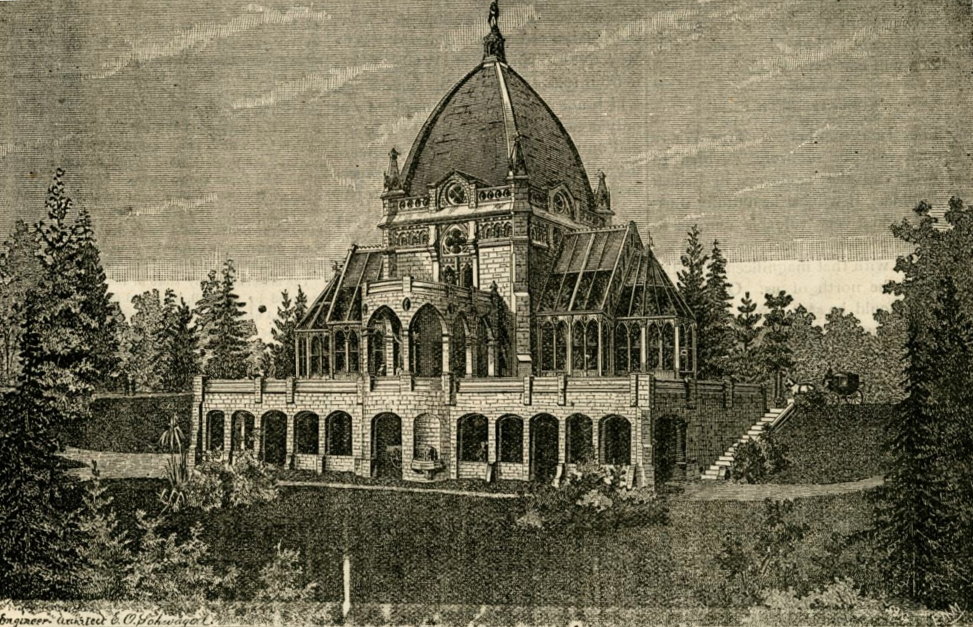
A rendering of the proposed design for a chapel and receiving vault at the River View Cemetery in Portland, Oregon, by the cemetery's designer, E. O. Schwagerl.

Schwagerl's first commission in the Pacific Northwest came while he was still working in Cleveland, when banker Henry Failing commissioned him in mid-1879 to design River View Cemetery in Portland, Oregon, designs for which Schwagerl finished by that December. In addition to laying out the cemetery grounds, he designed several buildings, including a chapel and receiving vault (pictured), but these were never built. The cemetery design was favorably received, with one review calling it "the most beautiful cemetery on the Pacific Coast." Schwagerl returned to Cleveland after a further proposal to lay out the grounds of City Park (now Washington Park) was not accepted.

=== Washington ===
He returned to the Northwest on a more permanent basis by 1889, when he was working in Tacoma designing the Lucius Manning residence. The following year, Tacoma's park board selected Schwagerl to design a public park (now known as Wright Park) on 27 acres that had been donated by Philadelphia-based financier Charles Barstow Wright. He also surveyed, mapped, and created designs for Point Defiance Park on land that had been recently ceded to the city of Tacoma by the federal government. Political differences in Tacoma, including concerns over the cost of the parks, led to Schwagerl being dismissed, and his friend Eben R. Roberts was appointed superintendent to oversee completion of the projects.

By May 1892, Schwagerl had been named Superintendent of Parks in Seattle. He oversaw the completion of Kinnear Park and was responsible for the design of the plantings and other amenities. He also revised the design of Denny Park "along formal lines with prettily conceived walks, mounds and sloping lawns, ornamented with clusters of trees, shrubbery and flowering plant which thrive," although the modern park was redesigned after being leveled as part of the Denny Regrade. He made some of the early improvements to what is now Volunteer Park, including building a nursery stocked with over 100,000 plants intended for eventual use in other Seattle parks.

He was also an early proponent of extending federal protection to Mount Rainier and its surrounding area, in order to save it from degradation due to overuse and vandalism. He said, "It is not foreign to the mission of the city’s park commission to be informed of some of the facts relative to the United States reservation created and designated as the 'Pacific Coast Park Reserve,'" and urged the park commission to petition the Secretary of Interior to take steps to protect the area.

Schwagerl's most recognized contribution to Seattle was development of a comprehensive plan for Seattle parks that he said, "provides for a system of attenuated parks and boulevards. It embraces four main parks, each park consisting of a natural project of peerless scope, breadth and range at the four corners, as it were, of the city." The four sites he identified include three modern-day parks, Seward Park, Discovery Park, and Magnuson Park, as well as Alki Point. He envisioned a "continuous boulevard, from 150 to 300 feet wide," encircling the city, which would branch off into smaller boulevards and parks. Despite the plan receiving enthusiastic support from the mayor and park commissioners, the city's financial difficulties caused by the ongoing recovery from the Great Seattle Fire and the Panic of 1893 meant no immediate progress was made.

In 1895, Schwagerl was retained to design the site of the Whatcom Normal School (now Western Washington University). He resigned his position as superintendent, effective at the end of 1895, and moved back to Tacoma to take up a position at Puget Sound University. His job was to design its permanent campus at University Place along with surrounding residential tracts, whose sale was supposed to fund the campus project. However, several years of financial trouble around servicing the debt on the project meant the campus was never built at University Place, which today is a purely residential area.

Schwagerl returned to private practice in Seattle thereafter, and in 1906 was asked to develop the new Mount Baker Addition along with George F. Cotterill, as part of the Olmsted Brothers' citywide park system that had been initiated in 1903. Among the designs Schwagerl contributed were those for Mount Baker Park.

== Legacy ==
When John C. Olmsted was brought to Seattle to implement a citywide parks system in 1903, he had sharp criticism of Schwagerl's work, writing to his wife of Denny Park: “His walks are very crooked often and his banks steep and high and his plantings very mixed but pretty much the same selection for every place." His opinion of Schwagerl's talents were summed up with: "[He] seems to be no very considerable artist in his line."

The Olmsted Brothers liked Schwagerl's work in Kinnear Park and left it relatively unchanged. Seattle's city engineer R. H. Thomson said the final Olmsted plan was "almost identical" to the one Schwagerl had proposed ten years earlier. Some present-day architects have assessed Schwagerl as "remarkable and distinguished" and "Seattle’s most important pioneer landscape architect."
