= Occidental Park =

Public park in Seattle, Washington, U.S.

Coordinates: 47°36′0.1″N 122°19′58.45″W

Occidental Square Park
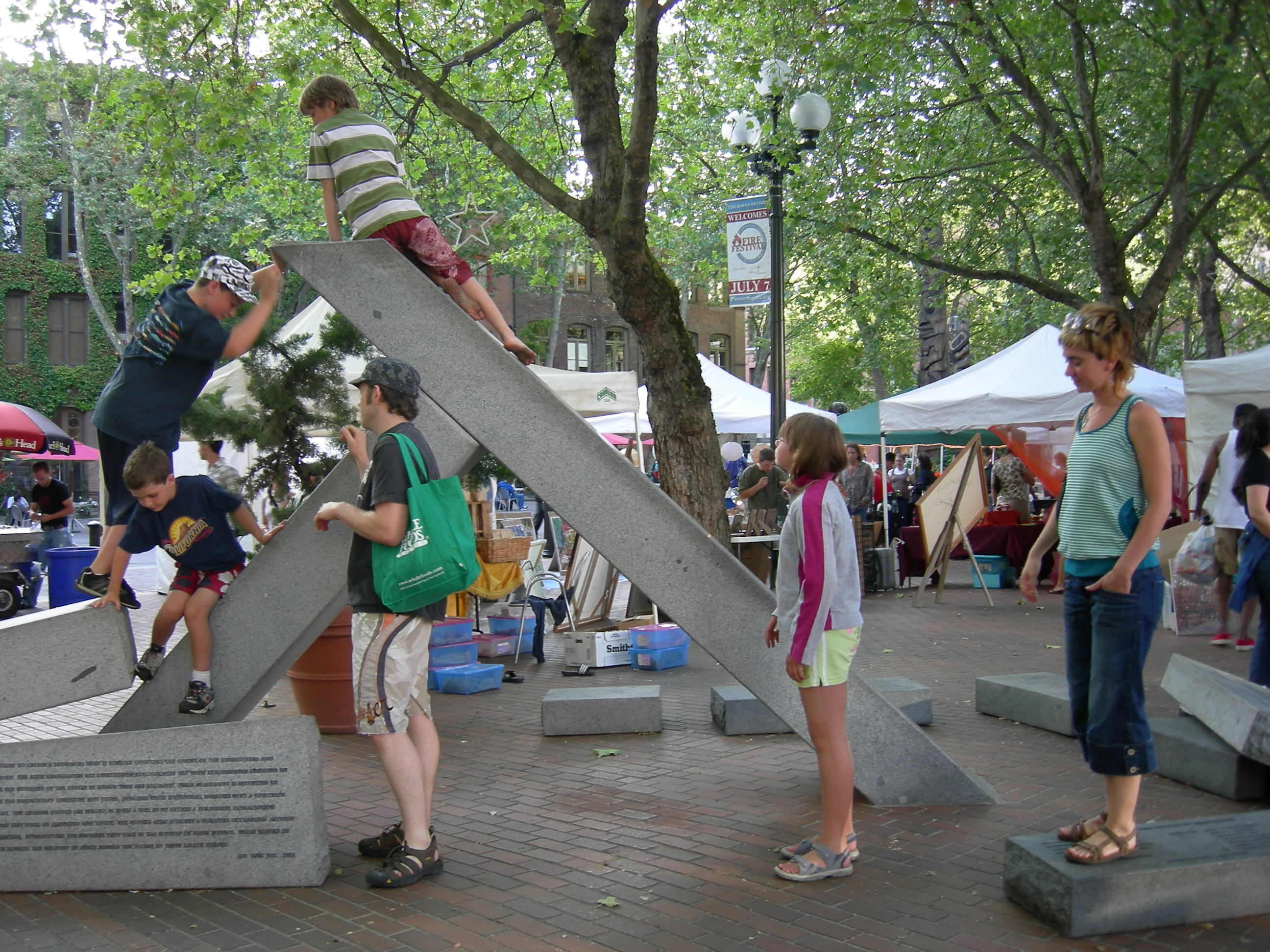
- Children playing on the Firefighters' Memorial in the park on the first Thursday in July 2007. First Thursday is the traditional evening for Pioneer Square art gallery openings. Many artists and craftspeople set up for the evening in the park.
- Interactive map of Occidental Square Park

Occidental Park, also referred to as Occidental Square (north of S. Main Street) and Occidental Mall (south of S. Main Street), is a 0.6 acre (2,400 m^{2}) public park located in the Pioneer Square district of Seattle, Washington.

== Description and history ==
Created in 1971, the park consists of the Occidental Avenue S. right-of-way between S. Washington and S. Jackson Streets, in addition to half a city block between S. Main and S. Jackson Streets. It is the site of the former Carrollton Hotel, run by a Japanese American family and described in Monica Sone's memoir Nisei Daughter, which was demolished in 1956.

In 1974, David Neth and others organized Seattle's first Pride Week, which eventually evolved into an annual monthlong tradition of Seattle Pride festivities. Around 200 LGBTQ people met to have a picnic and dance party in Occidental Park. The city officially adopted a Pride parade route ending at Occidental Park in 1977, and the park remained the end of the Pride Parade until the 1980s, when the parade moved to Capitol Hill. In 1978, activists successfully protested an anti-LGBTQ initiative at Occidental Park.

The former Waterfront Streetcar bisected the park, running along S. Main Street. The park is in the heart of Seattle's largest art gallery district, and several galleries face onto Occidental Mall. The Downtown Seattle Association began "activating" the park with summertime seating and activities in 2015 under a public–private partnership, also bringing events to be hosted in the park.

Occidental Park is the starting point for the "March to the Match", a five-block parade of Seattle Sounders FC soccer fans led by the Emerald City Supporters to Lumen Field prior to each home game. The park is also used for a weekly farmers' market and seasonal events managed by the Downtown Seattle Association.

The Fallen Firefighters Memorial is a bronze sculpture group by Hai Ying Wu. It was inspired by the deaths of four Seattle firefighters who died January 5, 1995 fighting a fire in the Mary Pang warehouse in Seattle's International District.

== See also ==
- Occidental Hotel
