= Bust of Henrik Ibsen =

Sculpture in Tacoma, Washington, U.S.

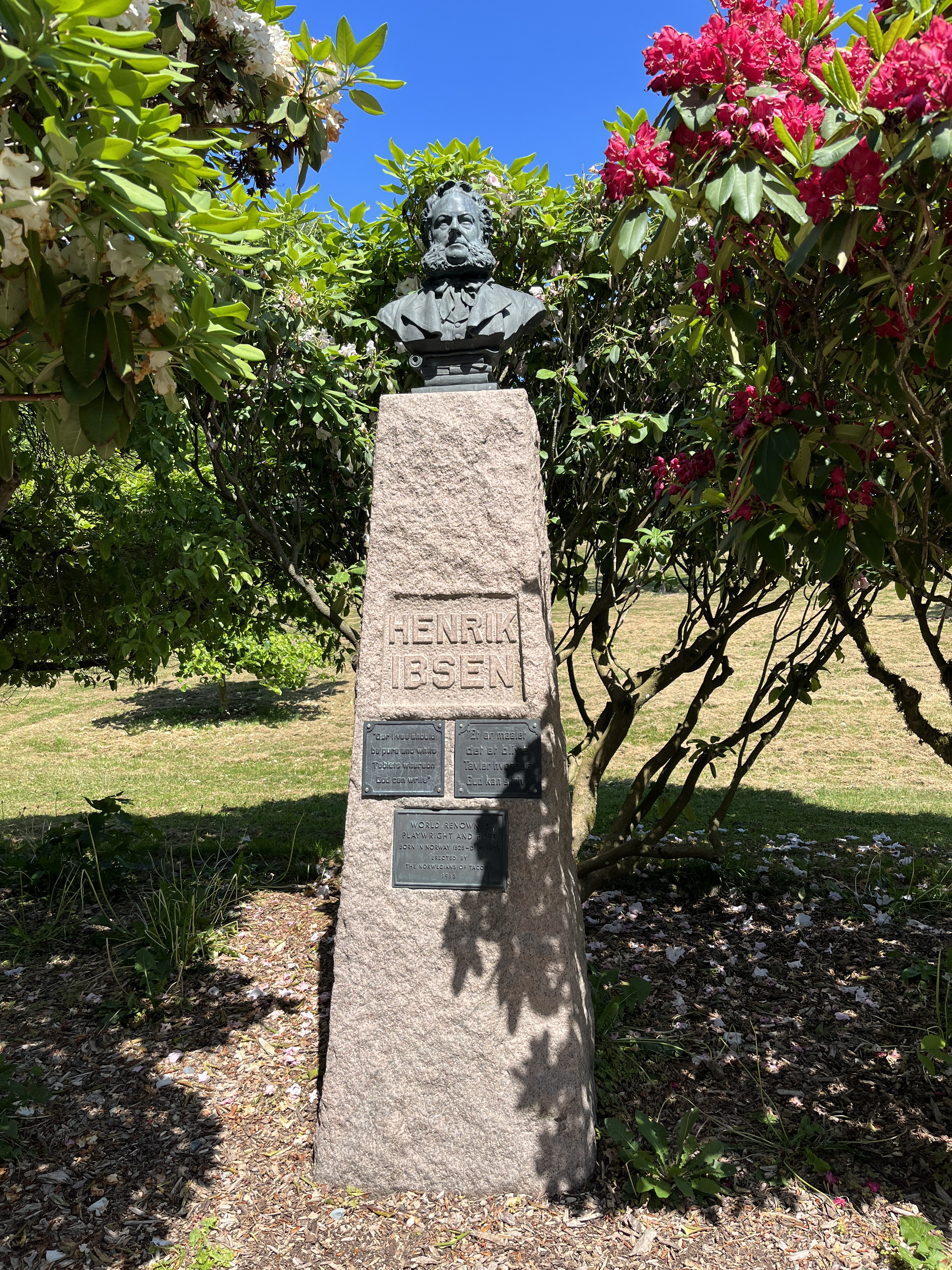
- The bust in 2023
- Artist: Jacob Fjelde
- Medium: Bronze sculpture
- Subject: Henrik Ibsen
- Location: Tacoma, Washington, U.S.; 47°15′39.3″N 122°26′56.4″W

A bust of Henrik Ibsen by Jacob Fjelde is installed in Tacoma, Washington's Wright Park, in the United States.

== Description ==
The bronze bust depicts Henrik Ibsen with sideburns. It measures approximately 29 x 24 x 12 inches and rests on a stone base which measures approximately 85 x 28 x 28 inches. One plaque on the front of the base reads: "Our lives should / be pure and white / Tablets whereon / God can write". Another says: "Et er maalet / der ar blive, / Tavler hvorpaa / Gud kan skrive". A third reads: "WORLD RENOWNED / PLAYWRIGHT AND POET / BORN IN NORWAY 1828-DIED 1906 / ERECTED BY / THE NORWEGIANS OF TACOMA / 1913".

The sculpture is surrounded by rhododendrons.

== History ==
The sculpture was dedicated on May 17, 1913, the 99th anniversary of Norway's separation from Denmark. According to Metro Parks Tacoma, the artwork commemorates "nationhood and the literary contributions" of Ibsen. The bust's mold was made in 1885; copies can be found at the North Dakota State College of Science in Wahpeton, North Dakota, at Como Park Zoo and Conservatory in Saint Paul, Minnesota, and at the Ibsenhuset arts complex in Ibsen's hometown of Skien.

The bust in Wright Park was rededicated in July 1987 by Metro Parks Tacoma and the Aalesund, Norway, Sister City Committee. The ceremony was attended by community members of the community members and teachers visiting Pacific Lutheran University from Norway.

== See also ==
- List of public art in Tacoma, Washington
