= Fisherman's Daughter =

Fisherman's Daughter may refer to:

- Fisherman's Daughter (album), a 1998 album by Kavisha Mazzella
- Fisherman's Daughter (sculpture), a sculpture in Tacoma, Washington
