= Trilogy (sculpture) =

Bronze statue by Larry Anderson in Tacoma, Washington, U.S.

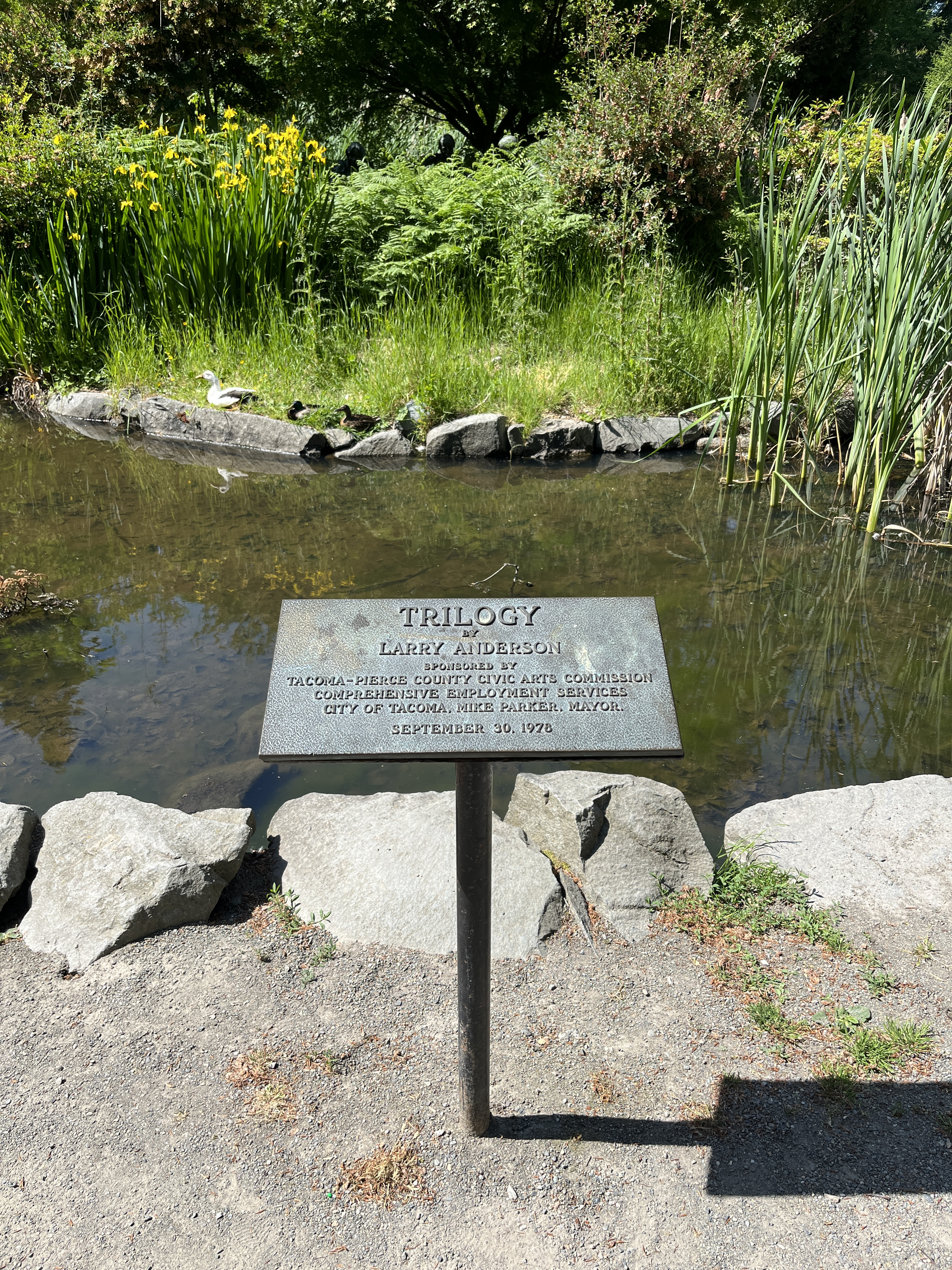
- Plaque for the artwork, which is covered by plants in the background, 2023
- Artist: Larry Anderson
- Medium: Bronze sculpture
- Location: Tacoma, Washington, U.S.
- 47°15′39″N 122°26′59.4″W

Trilogy is a bronze sculpture by Larry Anderson, installed in Tacoma, Washington's Wright Park, in the United States.

== Description and history ==
Commissioned by the city, the statue was installed in 1978 and depicts three children running. It is believed to be Tacoma's first sculpture depicting an African American.

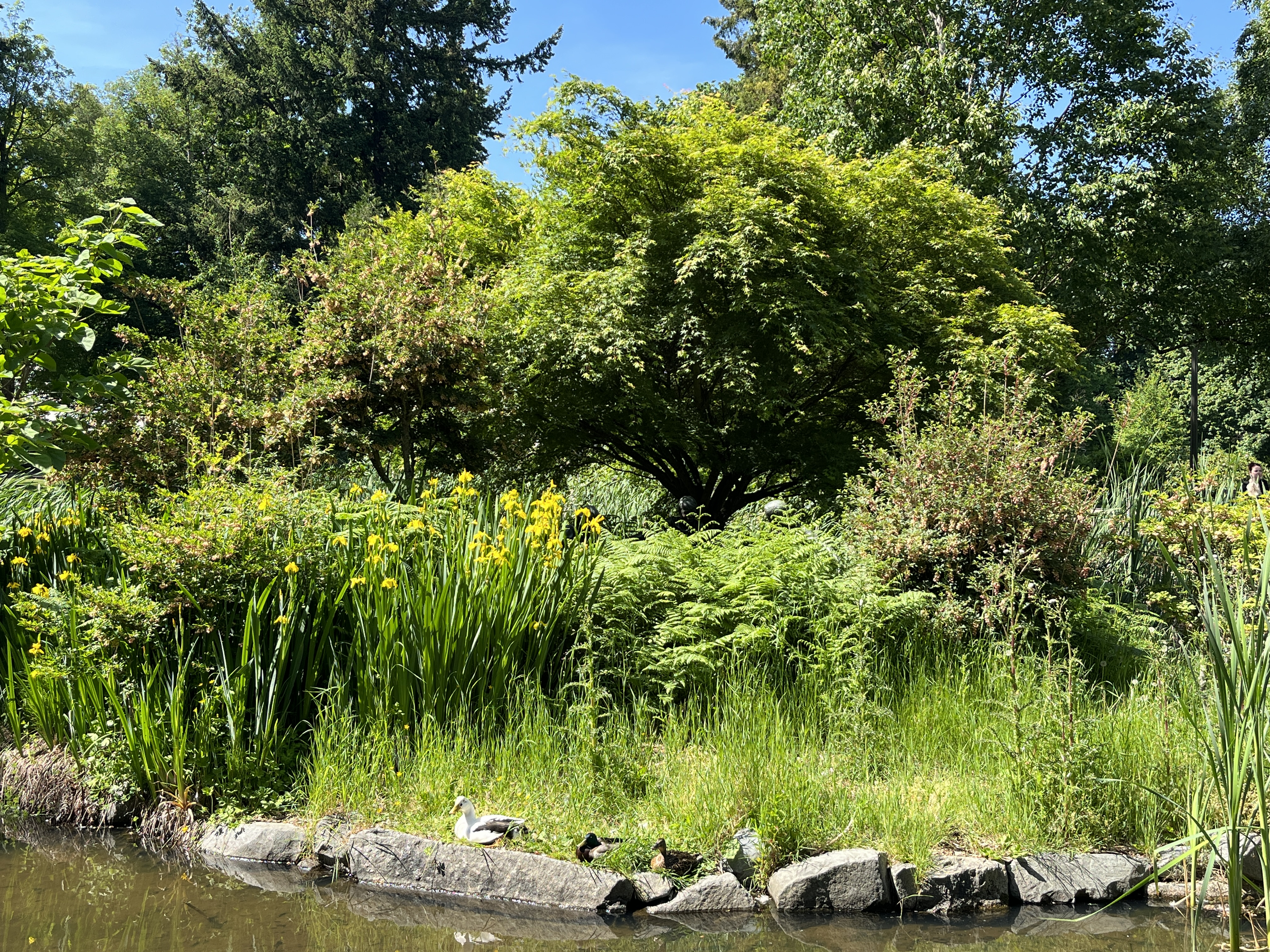
Trilogy hidden by plants, 2023

The artwork was acquired via the City of Tacoma's Changing Education Through the Arts program. It had an appraised value of $120,000 in 2007.

== See also ==
- List of public art in Tacoma, Washington
