= Annie and Fannie =

Pair of statues in Tacoma, Washington, U.S.

Coordinates: 47°15′45.5″N 122°26′58.7″W

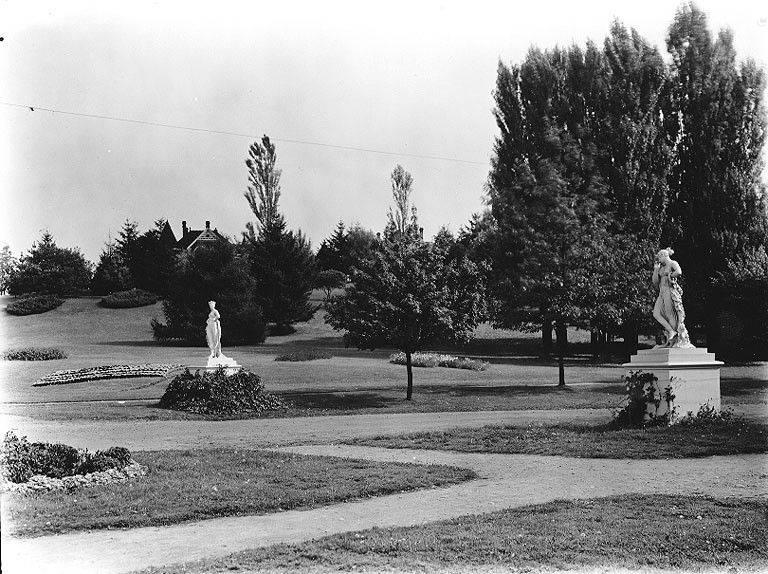
- The statues at Wright Park Arboretum's west entrance c. 1910
- Location: Tacoma, Washington, U.S.

"Annie" and "Fannie" are a pair of statues in Tacoma, Washington's Wright Park, in the United States. Sometimes collectively referred to as the "Dancing Girls" and "Greek Maidens", the sculptures flank the park's entrance at Division Avenue. Depicting dancing Greek maidens, the similar artworks were cast in a sandstone and concrete composite. Both were purchased and donated by local businessman Clinton P. Ferry in Europe in 1891, during the park's development. Their nicknames refer to Charles Wright's daughter and the park's proximity to Annie Wright Seminary, as well as the Fannie Paddock Hospital. Also known as "Violet" and "Pansy" during the 1930s, the sculptures were restored and erected on marble bases in 2009.

Both are based on original artworks by Italian artist Antonio Canova. One statue, officially Dancing Girl with Hand on Chin, is based on Dancing Girl with Her Finger on Her Chin (1806–10), now installed in Rome's Galleria Nazionale d'Arte Antica. According to Metro Parks Tacoma, "Early pictures show that the Ferry version of the statue did indeed have her hand on her chin when the statues were first installed in 1892, but sometime in the mid-20th century the statue was broken and restored with her hand across her waist instead." The other statue, officially Dancing Girl with Hands on Hips, is based on Dancing Girl with Her Hands on Her Hips (1806–10), now installed in the Hermitage Museum in St. Petersburg.

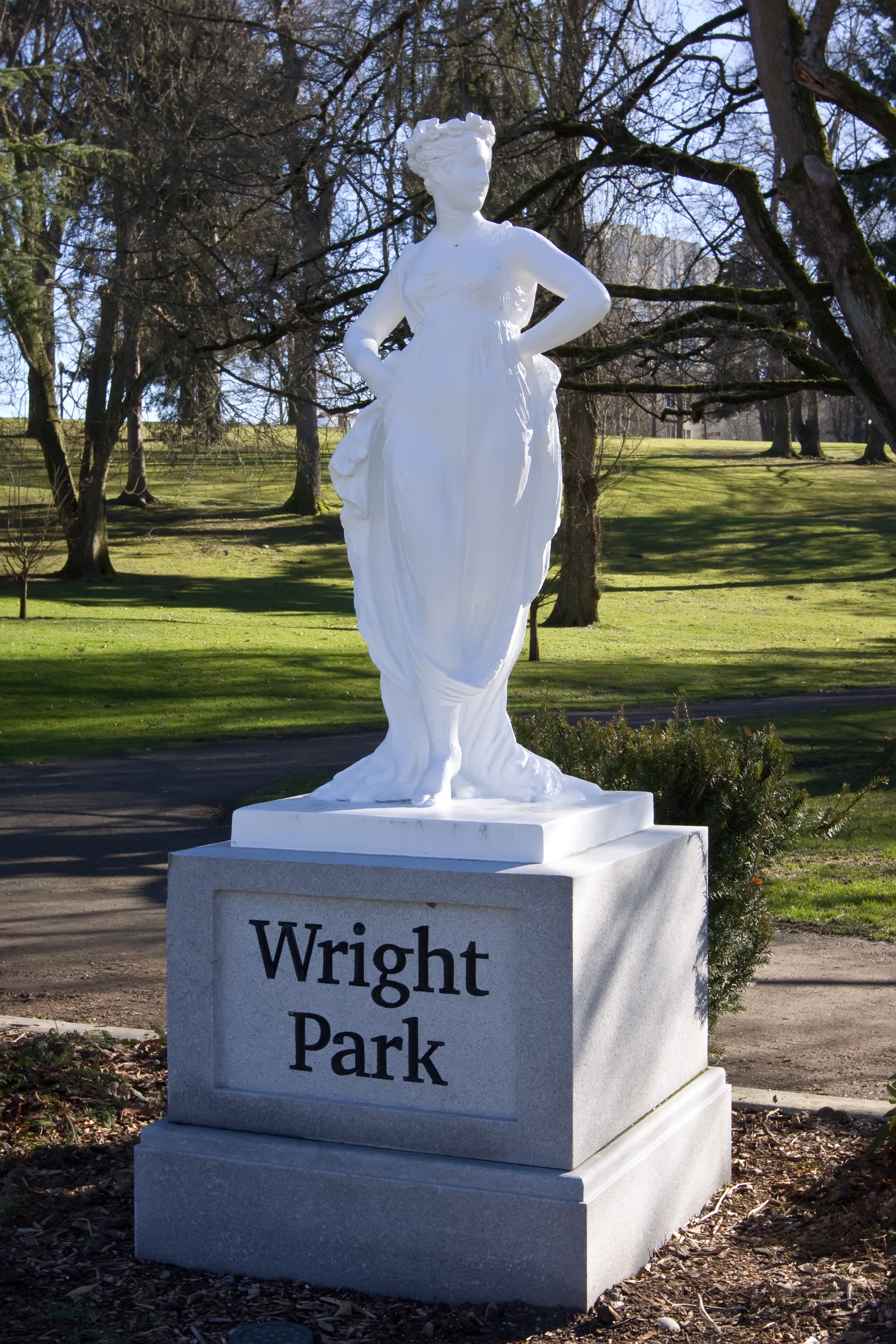

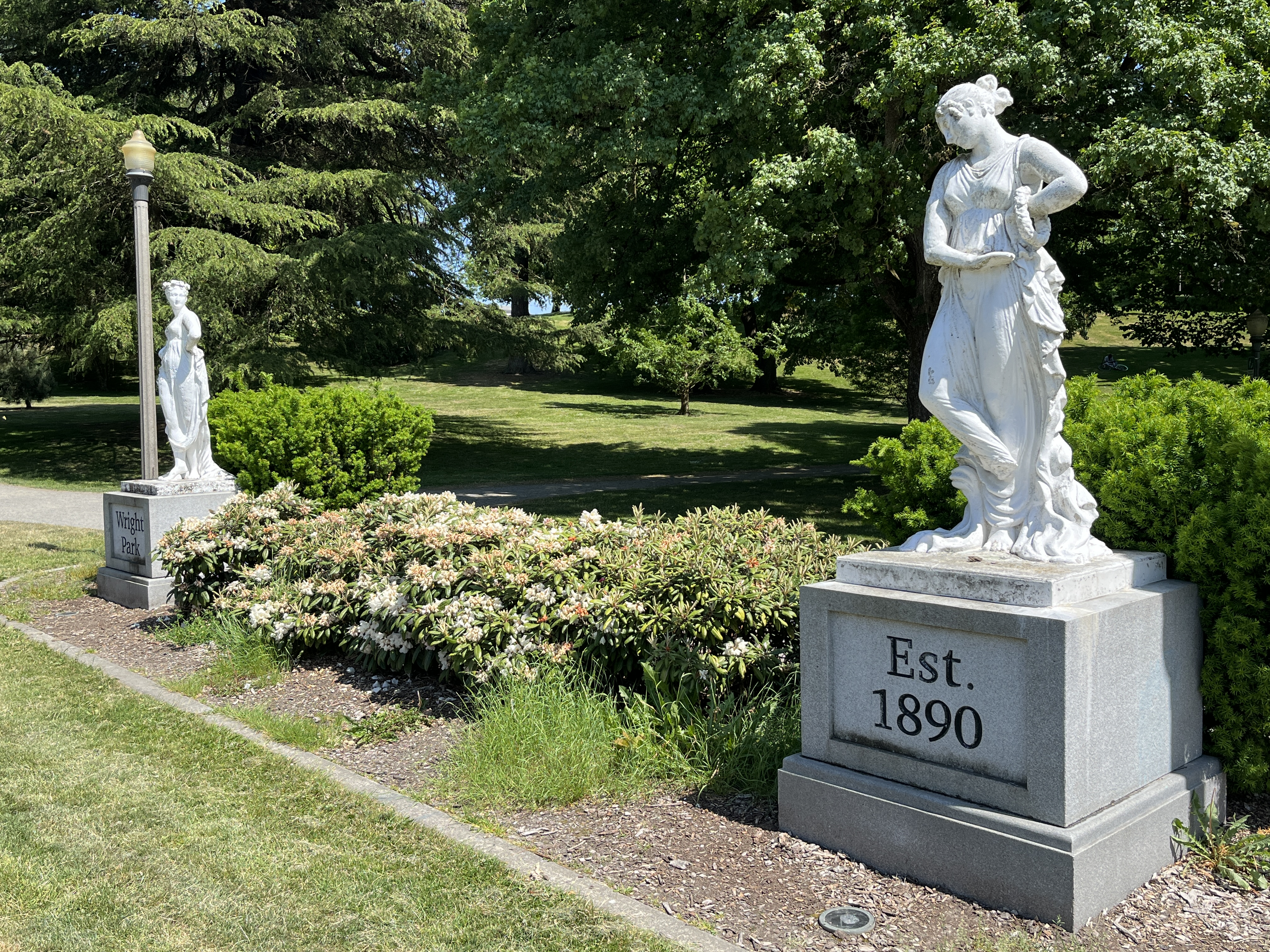

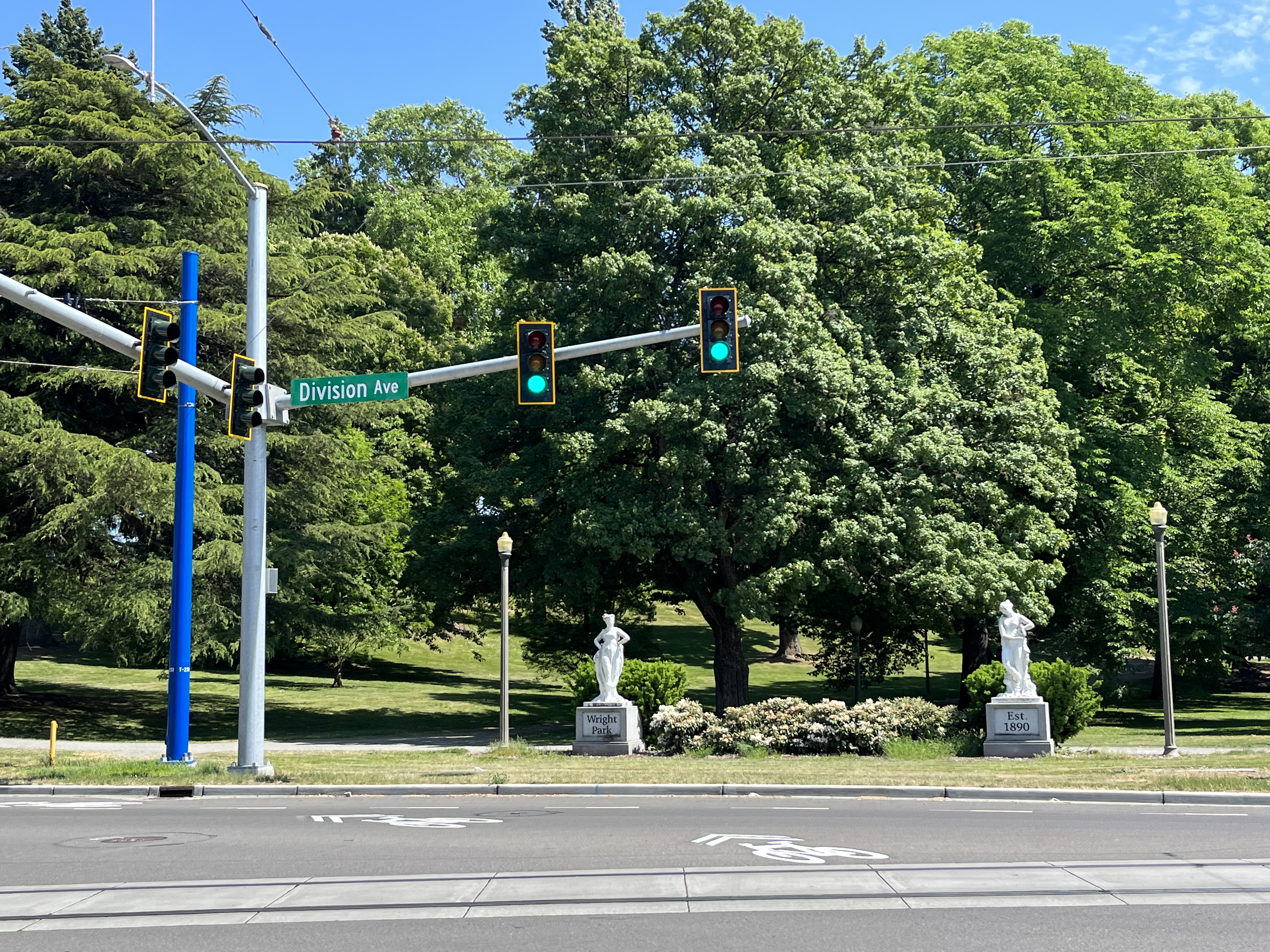

== See also ==
- List of public art in Tacoma, Washington
