= Esther Reed =

American criminal (born 1978)

Esther Elizabeth Reed
- Born: Esther Elizabeth Reed; March 8, 1978 (age 48); Townsend, Montana, U.S.
- Other names: Brooke Henson; Natalie Fisher; Natalie Bowman; Jennifer Myers
- Status: Released from prison on October 27, 2011
- Convictions: Fraud; Identity Theft
- Criminal charges: Mail fraud Wire fraud Identity theft False Statements
- Penalty: 51 months

Esther Elizabeth Reed (born March 8, 1978) is an American woman convicted of fraud and identity theft charges. She is best known for attending California State University, Fullerton and Columbia University School of General Studies using stolen identities, including that of missing person Brooke Henson.

== Biography ==
=== Early life and education ===
Reed was born in 1978 in Townsend, Montana, to Ernie and Florence Reed, the youngest of Florence's nine children. After her parents separated in the early 1990s, Reed moved with her mother to Mountlake Terrace, Washington. Reed dropped out of Mountlake Terrace High School in 1995; three years later, her mother died of colon cancer.

=== Missing person ===
In October 1999, Reed pleaded guilty in King County, Washington to attempted possession of stolen property. Shortly after, Reed disappeared and her family did not hear from her again. She was reported missing in 2004 by her father after social security checks revealed she was alive. While Reed was missing, she assumed the identities of other people. Reed's situation is unusual because, unlike most identity thieves, she did not use the identities to run up credit card debt. Instead, she used the fictitious names to obtain an education and start a new life.

In 2001, Reed assumed the identity of Natalie Bowman and enrolled as an adjunct student at California State University in Fullerton, California. While at Fullerton, Reed joined CSUF's debate team and competed in several tournaments, often advancing to the final round. At CSUF, Reed became friends with several debaters at the United States Military Academy at West Point and at the United States Naval Academy at Annapolis. She dated one of the cadets for an extended period of time. Eventually the US Army Criminal Investigation Command investigated Reed, believing she might have been involved in espionage; the investigators determined these suspicions were unfounded.

In 2003, Reed moved on and earned her GED, using the identity of Brooke Henson, another missing person from Travelers Rest, South Carolina. Reed also took the SAT and achieved a score of 1400. Using her new credentials, Reed applied to Columbia University, School of General Studies, and was admitted to the university. She attended Columbia for two years, where she majored in psychology and had a 3.22 GPA.

In 2006, after an internet search by an employer revealed Brooke Henson's real identity, police in South Carolina alerted New York City police to Reed. After agreeing to give DNA to prove she was indeed Brooke Henson, Esther Reed fled New York City. She relocated to Chicago and changed her identity to Jennifer Myers.

Reed was featured on the United States Secret Service's 10-most-wanted fugitive list and America's Most Wanted on the Fox Television Network. She was featured twice in 48 Hours Mystery episodes on CBS: the first, Capture the Queen, aired in 2007, and the second, Catch Her If You Can, aired in 2009.

=== Capture ===
On February 3, 2008, in Tinley Park, Illinois, Reed was captured by Tinley Park Police who were searching the entire area for a gunman who shot and killed five women at a Lane Bryant store. The police were checking all out-of-state license plates in the area. Reed's car was in a Sleep Inn motel parking lot in the area. Federal marshals and police knocked on her motel door and asked her for her ID. The authorities noticed that the ID she handed them had been flagged by the Secret Service, so she was transported to the police station for questioning, where she confirmed her real name.

=== Conviction ===
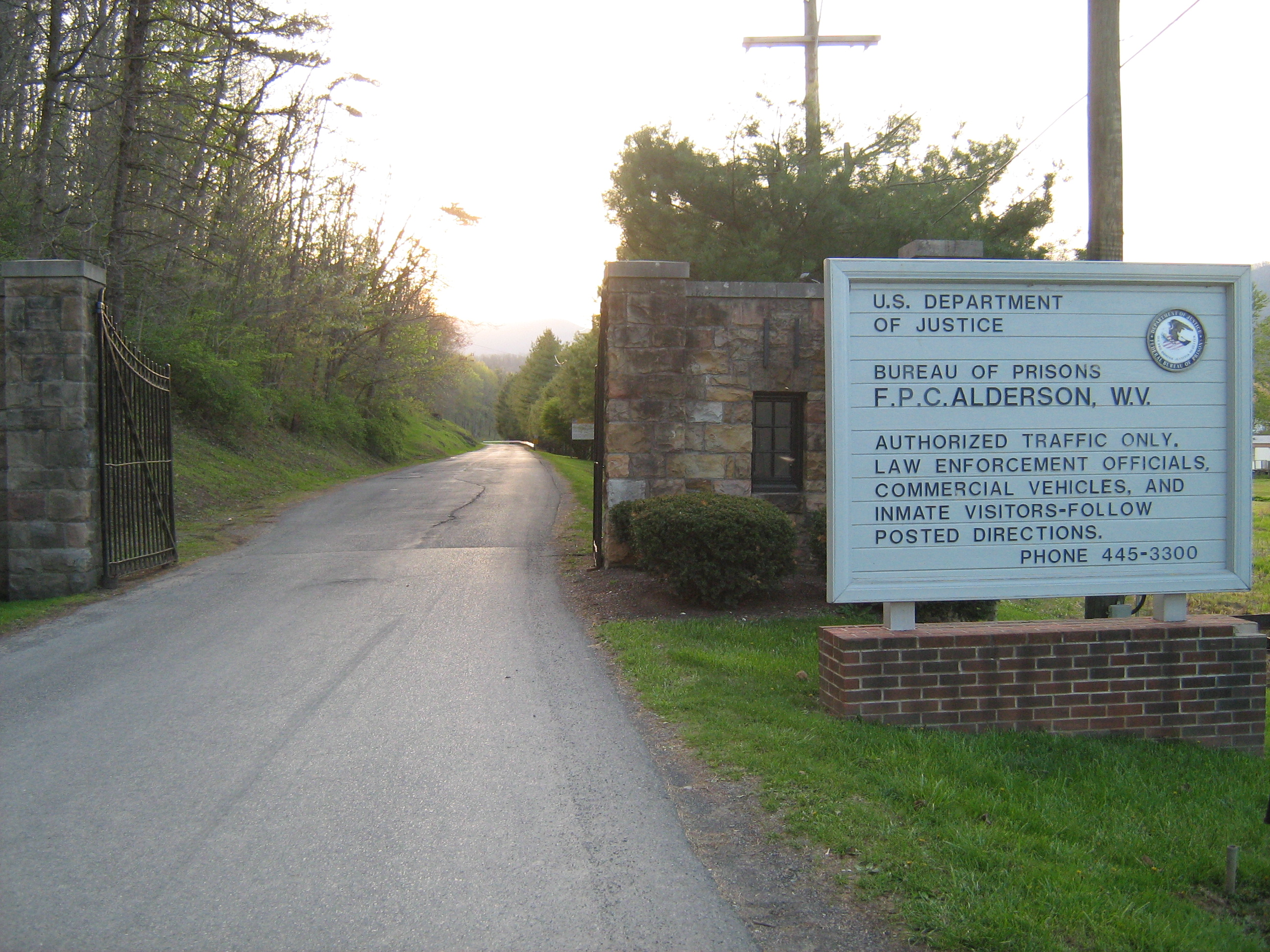
Federal Prison Camp, Alderson

After being found by the police, Reed was extradited to South Carolina, where she was tried on four felony charges related to fraud and identity theft. Facing up to 47 years in prison, she pled guilty. At her sentencing, Reed's attorney argued that her behavior was the result of mental health issues stemming from the death of her mother and severe social anxiety. The lawyer said that Reed began to experience social phobia during her freshman year of high school, that her difficulties were mitigated by the presence of her mother, and that once she lost her mother's support, Reed's life began to unravel. Reed was sentenced to 51 months in prison and was released from federal prison on October 27, 2011.
