= State Bank of Townsend =

- U.S. National Register of Historic Places
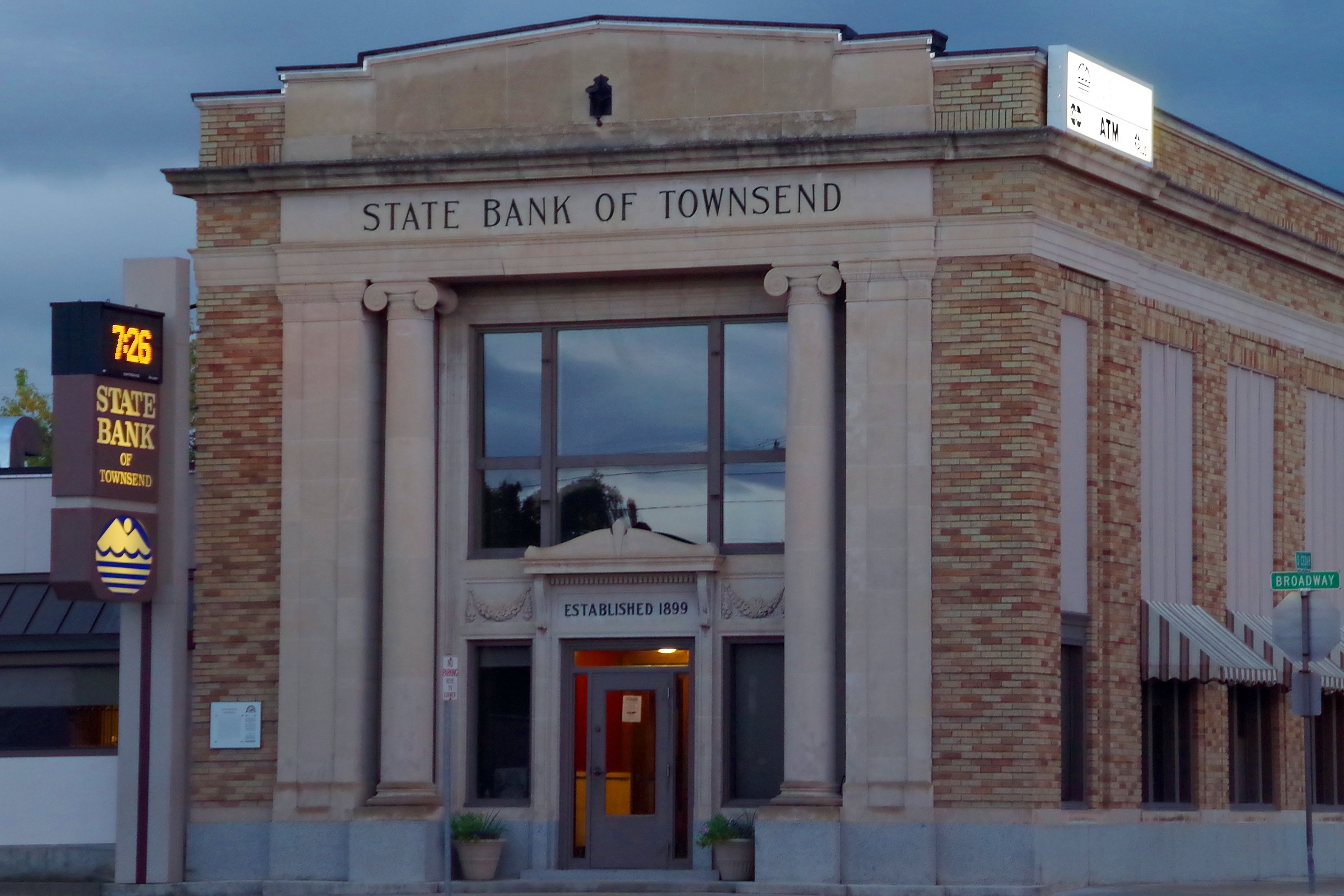

- Location within Montana Location within the United States
- Location: 400 Broadway
- Coordinates: 46°19′12″N 111°31′51″W
- Architectural style: Classical Revival
- NRHP reference No.: 91001941
- Added to NRHP: January 13, 1992

The State Bank of Townsend is a site on the National Register of Historic Places located in Townsend, Montana. It was added to the Register on January 13, 1992. The bank opened in 1899 and continues operating as a bank today.
