= St. Joseph's Catholic Mission Church =

Historic church in Montana, United States

- U.S. National Register of Historic Places
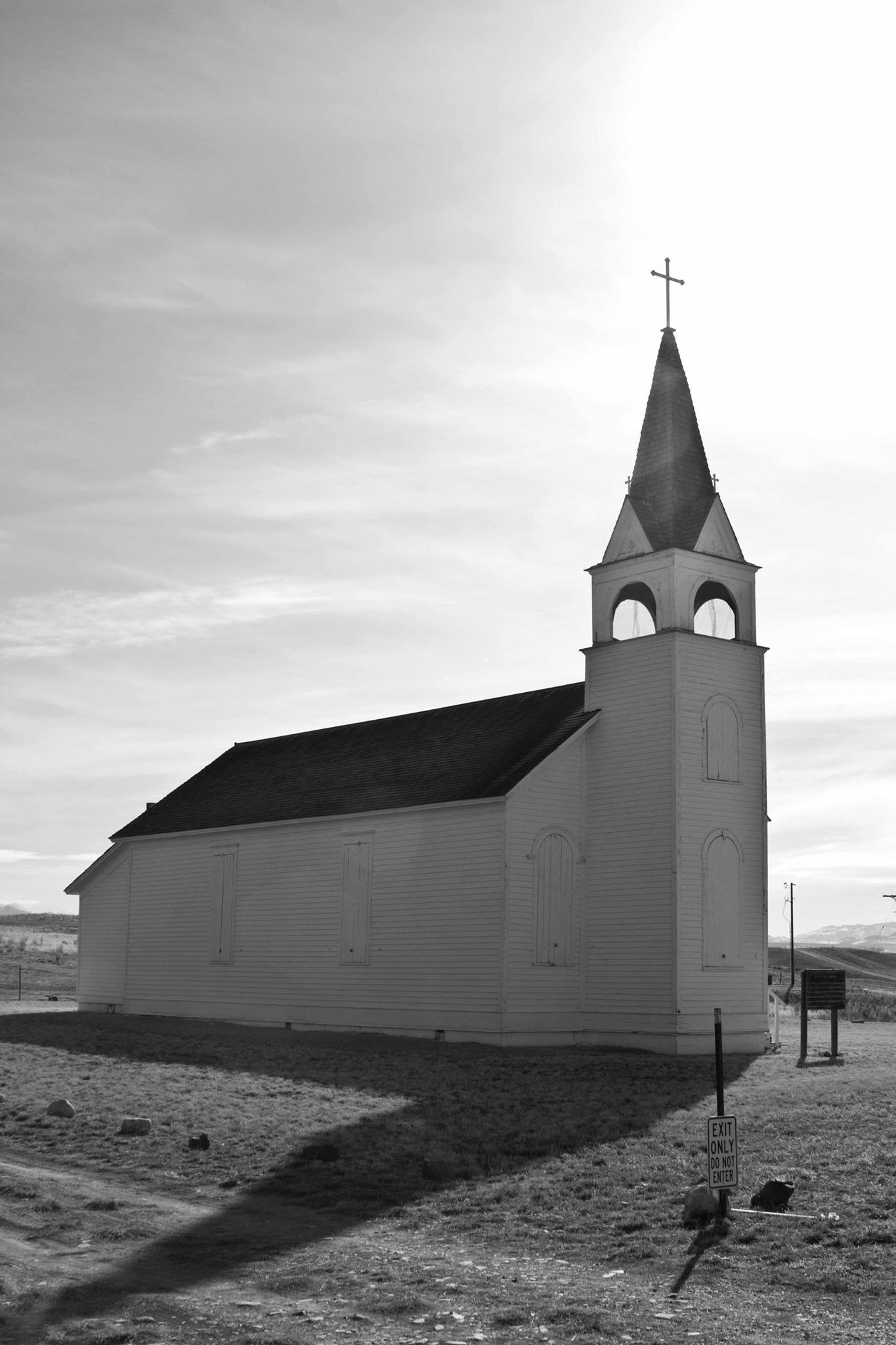

- Location within Montana Location within the United States
- Location: 3497 Montana Highway 284; Townsend, Montana
- Coordinates: 46°24′32″N 111°26′55″W
- Built by: Thomas Howell
- NRHP reference No.: 98001339
- Added to NRHP: November 5, 1998

St. Joseph's Catholic Mission Church or Old Pep is a site on the National Register of Historic Places located in Townsend, Montana. It was added to the Register on November 5, 1998. Originally a Catholic church, the building is now a museum known as Canton Church Historic Site.

The church referred to by some locals as the Old Pep was built during 1875–76. According to its NRHP nomination, it is "the oldest extant example of secular Roman Catholic church architecture in Montana. It is also a rare example of Colonial Style architecture. The addition of a belfry and steeple in 1902 somewhat altered the church's Colonial appearance, but still carried forward its earlier design features."

The church building was moved to its current location in 1954 by the U.S. Bureau of Reclamation in order to save it from demolition.
