= Wright Park (Tacoma, Washington) =

- Wright Park and Seymour Conservatory
- U.S. National Register of Historic Places
- U.S. Historic district
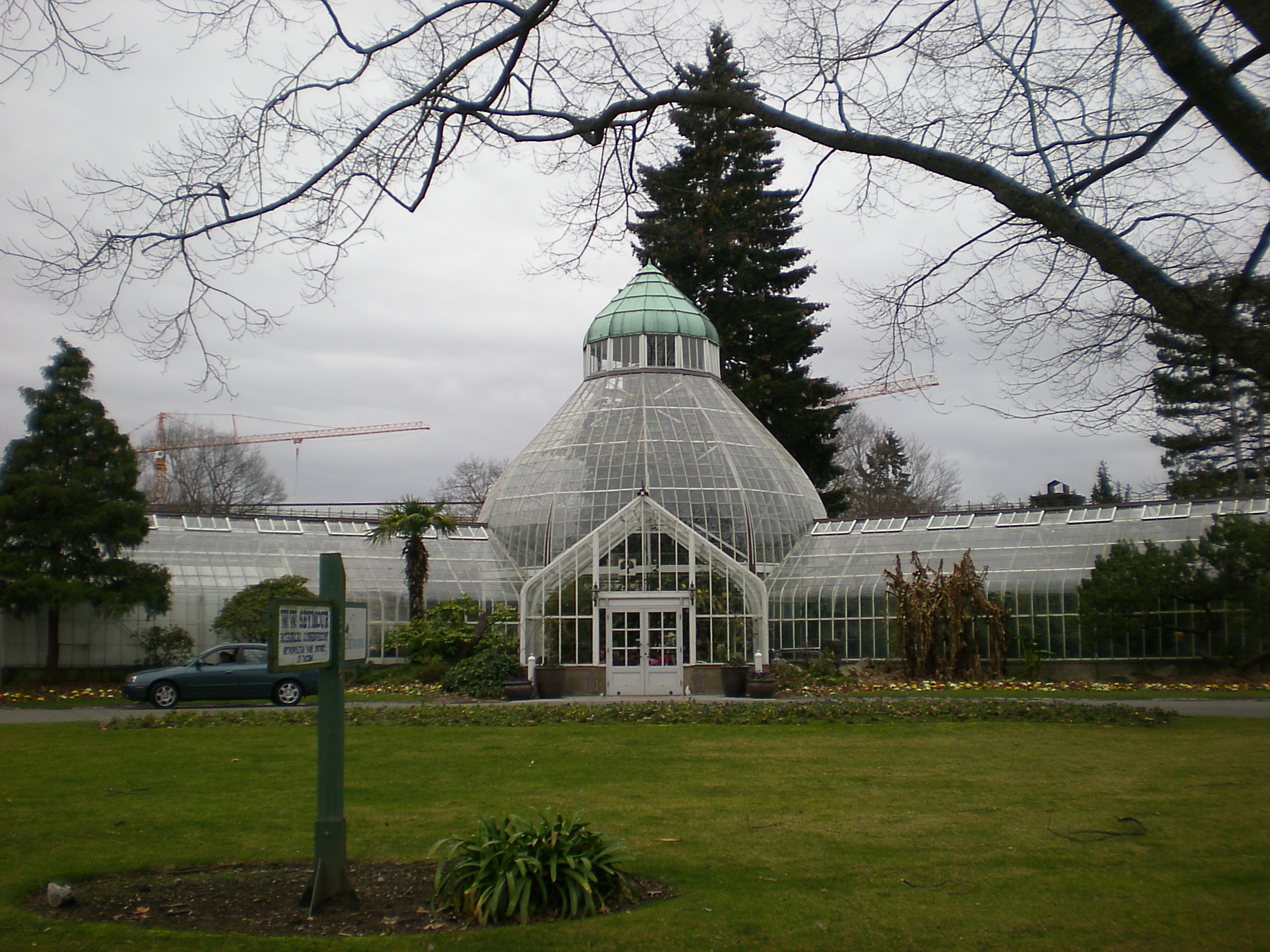
- The Seymour Conservatory

- Location within Washington (state)
- Location: Tacoma, Washington
- Coordinates: 47.2603°N 122.4483°W
- Built: 1886
- Architect: E. O. Schwagerl; Et al.
- Architectural style: Victorian Style
- NRHP reference No.: 76001904
- Added to NRHP: October 8, 1976

Wright Park is a 27-acre (11 ha) arboretum and public park located in Tacoma, Washington, that is managed by Metro Parks Tacoma. The park was designed by Bavarian landscape architect Edward Otto Schwagerl. The park was named in honor of Charles Barstow Wright, who had donated the land for the project.

== Description ==
The arboretum contains over 700 mature trees, representing about 100 native and exotic species.

Several artworks are installed in the park, including a bust of Henrik Ibsen, the Greek maidens nicknamed "Annie" and "Fannie", Fisherman's Daughter, Trilogy, and a pair of lions.

=== W. W. Seymour Botanical Conservatory ===
The W. W. Seymour Botanical Conservatory is a Victorian-style conservatory located in Wright Park. Built in 1907, it was named in honor of donor William W. Seymour. Designed by Isaac J. Knapp, its wings and twelve-sided central dome contain some 3,500 panes of glass. Six sculptures created by former conservator Clarence Deming rest among the plants and reflect African, Māori, and Aztec traditions.

The conservatory contains more than 550 plant species in its permanent collection, including agapanthus, azaleas, bromeliads, cacti, clivias, cymbidium, epiphyllum, ferns, figs, more than 200 orchids, palms, and rhododendrons. It also contains a rotating exhibit of floral displays that generally features between 300–500 blooming plants at any given time.

The conservatory was featured in several scenes in the 1992 film The Hand that Rocks the Cradle, starring Annabella Sciorra and Rebecca De Mornay and directed by Curtis Hanson.

== See also ==
- List of botanical gardens in the United States
- List of Registered Historic Places in Pierce County, Washington

== Sources ==
- McGinnis, Melissa; Beard-Simpkins, Doreen (2007). Tacoma's Parks. Arcadia Publishing. ISBN 978-0-7385-4896-8.
