= Fallen Firefighters Memorial (Wu) =

Sculpture by Hai Ying Wu in Seattle, Washington, U.S.

- Artist: Hai Ying Wu
- Year: 1998
- Type: Bronze
- Location: Seattle; 47°36.011′N 122°19.975′W
- Owner: City of Seattle

Fallen Firefighters Memorial is a bronze sculpture group by Hai Ying Wu.

It is located in Occidental Park, Seattle, near the intersection of Occidental Avenue and Main Street. It was inspired by the deaths of four Seattle firefighters who died January 5, 1995 fighting a fire in the Mary Pang warehouse in Seattle's International District.

== See also ==
- List of firefighting monuments and memorials
