= Prairie Line Trail =

Linear park in Tacoma, Washington, U.S.

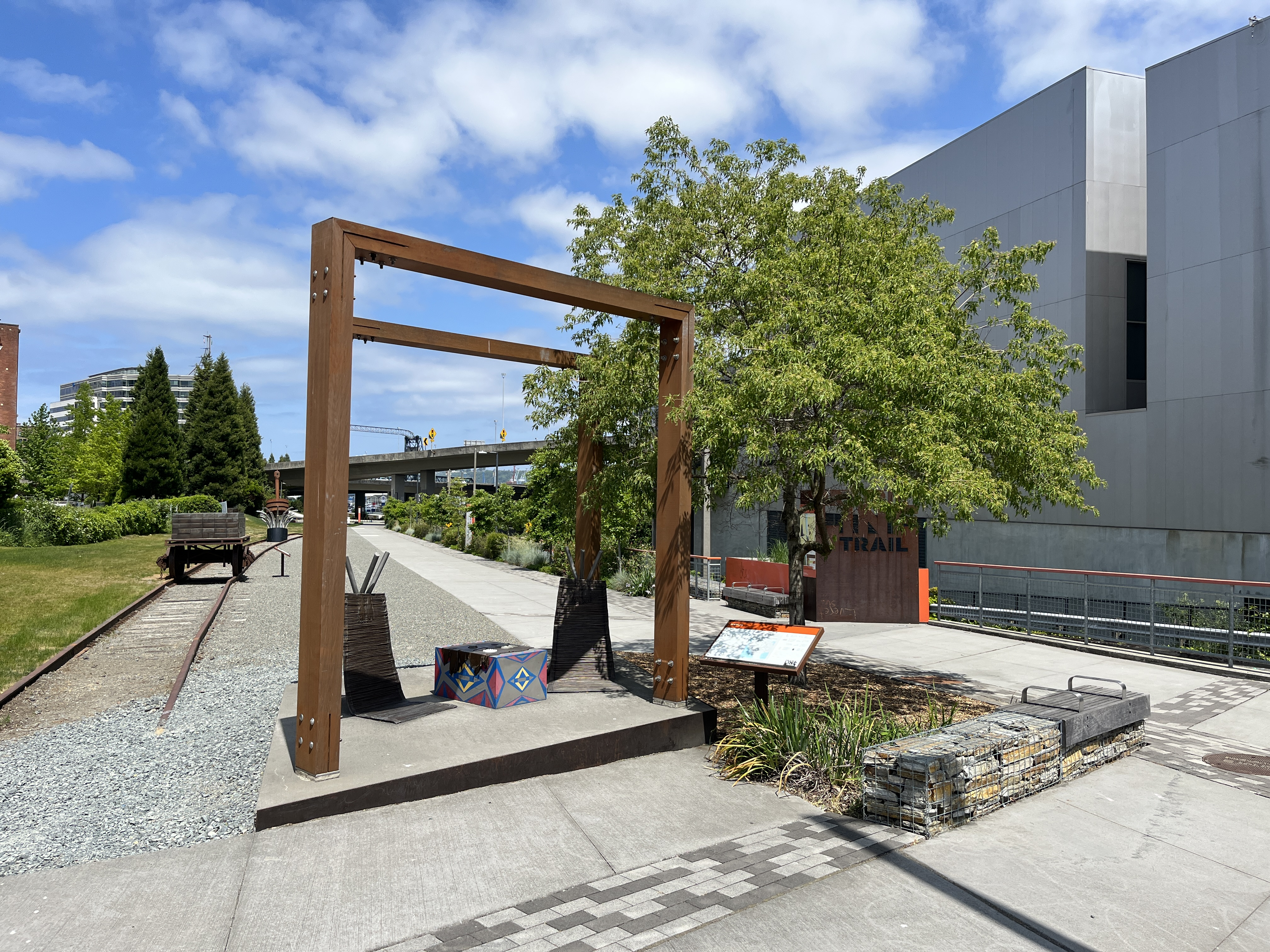
- Signage and art installations in the park in 2023
- Interactive map of Prairie Line Trail
- Location: Tacoma, Washington, U.S.
- Coordinates: 47°14′43″N 122°26′17″W

Prairie Line Trail is a mile-long linear park in Tacoma, Washington, United States. The rail trail follows former railroad tracks and has multiple public art installations, including Shipment to China.

In October 2019, a celebration was held for the opening of the downtown Tacoma segment of the trail, which stretches from the University of Washington Tacoma campus to the Foss Waterfront.
