= Crow Creek Water Ditch =

- U.S. National Register of Historic Places
- Location within Montana Location within the United States
- Location: 201 Pennsylvania St.
- Coordinates: 46°19′49″N 111°41′04″W
- Architectural style: Water supply system
- NRHP reference No.: 01000323
- Added to NRHP: March 29, 2001

The Crow Creek Water Ditch is a historic water transportation system which brought water from Eureka Creek to where it was needed in gold placer mining in the Indian Creek drainage area where gold was discovered in 1866. It is located near Townsend, Montana. It was built between 1866 and c.1875 originally to support gold mining, which required water, then later was used for farm and ranch irrigation.

Over its 11 miles (18 km) length it dropped from 6,300 feet (1,900 m) to 4,000 feet (1,200 m) elevation. Along most of its length, in two sections, it was a hand-dug ditch about 3 feet (0.91 m) wide and 1 foot (0.30 m) deep that was dug using shovels, picks and axes. One section was a "spectacular" 1,578 feet (481 m) wooden flume which brought it along walls of Hassel Canyon. It also included a 3 miles (4.8 km) section where it ran down natural gullies where no digging was needed.

An approximately 8 miles (13 km) portion of it--the two hand-dug sections--was listed on the National Register of Historic Places in 2001. The listed area also includes remnants of a wooden flume, and a rubble stone dam.

In 1918 the Crow Creek Irrigation District was formed by farmers and ranchers for irrigation. With the creation of Canyon Ferry Lake the need for the canals decreased.
