= KDGZ-LP =

- Townsend, Montana; United States
- Frequency: 98.3 MHz

Ownership
- Owner: Townsend K12 School District #1

Technical information
- Licensing authority: FCC
- Facility ID: 134523
- Class: L1
- ERP: 100 watts
- HAAT: −84.6 meters (−278 ft)
- Transmitter coordinates: 46°19′15″N 111°30′53″W

Links
- Public license information: LMS

KDGZ-LP (98.3 FM) is a radio station licensed to Townsend, Montana, United States. The station is currently owned by Townsend K12 School District #1.
