= Shipment to China =

Sculpture by Hai Ying Wu in Tacoma, Washington, U.S.

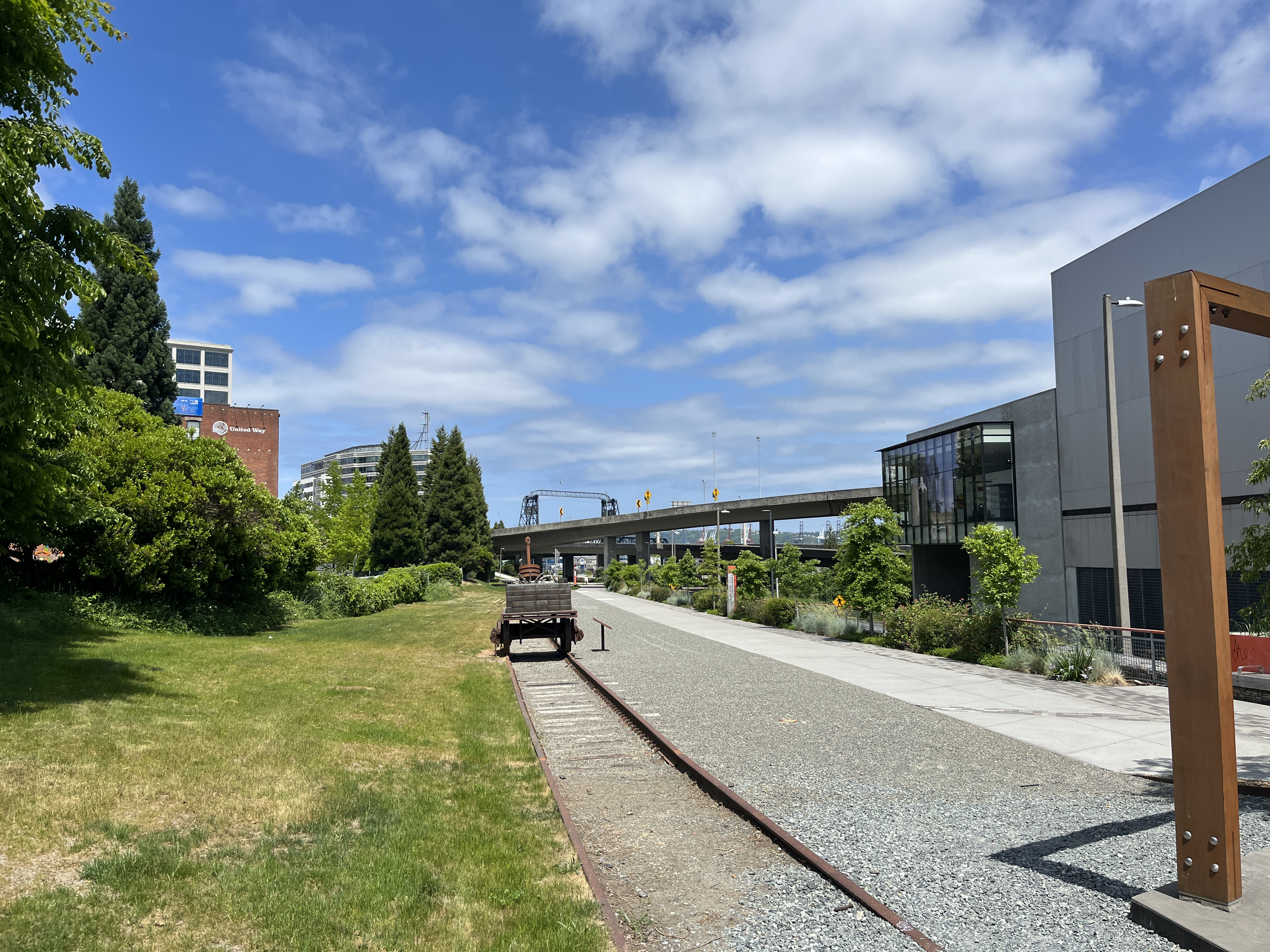
- The sculpture in Prairie Line Trail, Tacoma, Washington, 2023
- Artist: Hai Ying Wu
- Medium: Bronze sculpture
- Location: Tacoma, Washington, U.S.
- 47°14′53″N 122°26′13.5″W

Shipment to China is an abstract sculpture by Hai Ying Wu, installed in Tacoma, Washington's Prairie Line Trail, in the United States. It has 100 bronze boxes on a 1909 train car. According to Wu, the work "shows the bitterness of the Chinese experience in America during that time, for the railroad built by their efforts was the same transportation used to carry them out of Tacoma".

According to the Prairie Line Trail's website, the sculpture was donated by the Chinese Reconciliation Project Foundation, restored and installed by the City of Tacoma, and funded by the Washington State Heritage Capital Projects Fund.

== See also ==
- List of public art in Tacoma, Washington
