= Eagle Guard Station =

Historic place in Montana, United States

- U.S. National Register of Historic Places
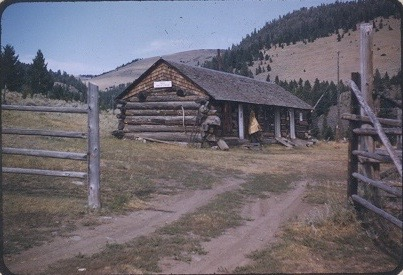
- Eagle Guard Station in 1956

- Location within Montana Location within the United States
- Nearest city: 11 miles west of Townsend, Montana
- Area: 90 acres (36 ha)
- Built: 1895
- Built by: Owens, Dick; Wilson, Jack
- Architectural style: Cabin
- NRHP reference No.: 01001014
- Added to NRHP: September 20, 2001

The Eagle Guard Station is a site on the National Register of Historic Places located about 11 miles west of Townsend, Montana. It was added to the Register on September 20, 2001.

Eagle Creek Ranger Station was originally built by Richard (Dick) Owen and Jack Wilson in 1895.

In 1905, the Elkhorn Forest Reserve was formed and between this date and the forming of the Helena National Forest in 1908, the Eagle Cabin was taken over by the U.S. Forest Service for administrative use. Eagle, Tizer and Glendale stations were all tied together by a telephone line that went into a switchboard at the store in Radersburg. The cabin is the oldest administrative log structure on the Helena National Forest and, in fact, predates the establishment of the Forest. Eagle was used by the Forest Service on a regular basis until the early 1950s. Riders from the Crow and Indian Creek Livestock Association used the cabin over the years up until the 1970s.

Eagle Cabin is the oldest administrative log structure on the Helena National Forest.
