= Locomotive Monument =

1988 sculpture by Doug Granum in Tacoma, Washington, U.S.

- Artist: Doug Granum
- Year: 1988
- Medium: Ceramic and steel sculpture
- Subject: Locomotive
- Location: Tacoma, Washington, U.S.
- 47°15′2.8″N 122°26′10.6″W

The Locomotive Monument (sometimes referred to as Locomotive) is an abstract 1988 sculpture of a locomotive by Doug Granum, installed in Tacoma, Washington, in the United States.

== Description ==
The Locomotive Monument is an abstract ceramic and steel artwork depicting a locomotive, installed in Tacoma, Washington. It measures approximately 15 feet x 32 feet x 24 inches, and rests on a base that measures approximately 54 inches x 33 feet x 5 feet.

A nearby plaque reads: "To the creative spirit, / in honor of the City of Tacoma's heritage, / celebrating the City of Tacoma's future. / LOCOMOTIVE MONUMENT / by / Douglas Charles Granum / donated to the City of Tacoma / AUGUST 17, 1988 / by / Ben B Cheney Foundation / Burlington Northern Foundation / Puget Sound Bank / Haub Brother's Enterprise Trust / The Wagner Fund / The Gottfried and Mary Fuchs Foundation / Frank Russell Company / First Instate Bank / Dr. and Mrs. George C. Brain, The Greater Tacoma Community Foundation Friends of the Arts".

== History ==
The artwork was surveyed by the Smithsonian Institution's "Save Outdoor Sculpture!" program in 1995. It had an appraised value of $250,000 in 2007. In 2008, the sculpture was cleaned and re-caulked at the seams.

== See also ==
- List of public art in Tacoma, Washington
- Trains in art
