= Townsend, Montana =

City in Montana, United States

- City
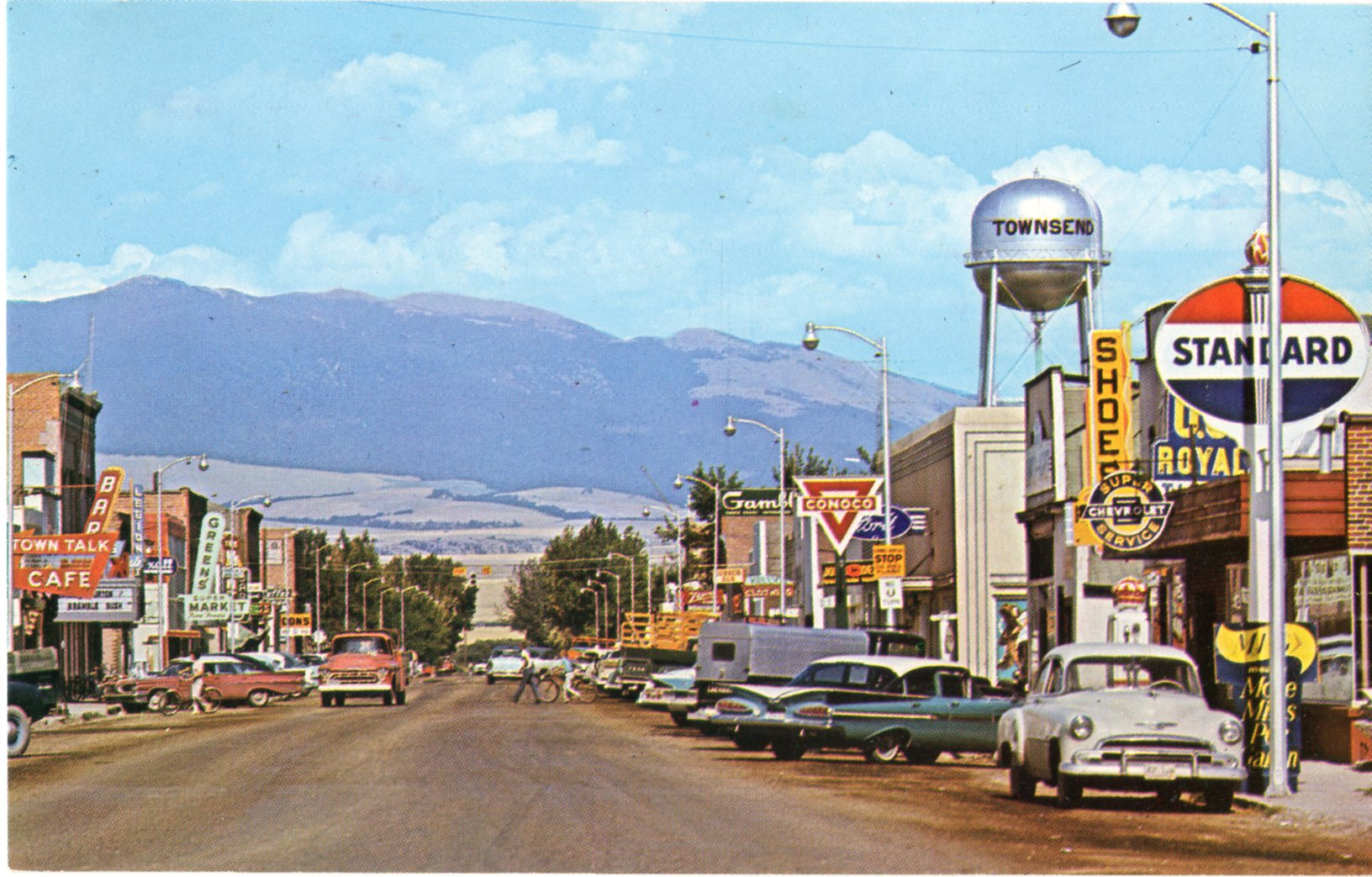
- Broadway Street c. 1960

- Logo
- Mottoes: First City on the Missouri & Valley of Adventure
- Location of Townsend, Montana

- Location in the United States
- Coordinates: 46°19′09″N 111°31′11″W
- Country: United States
- State: Montana
- County: Broadwater

Government
  - Type: Mayor-City Council

Area
  - Total: 1.53 sq mi (3.97 km^{2})
  - Land: 1.53 sq mi (3.97 km^{2})
  - Water: 0 sq mi (0.00 km^{2})
- Elevation: 3,842 ft (1,171 m)

Population (2020)
  - Total: 1,787
  - Density: 1,166.9/sq mi (450.55/km^{2})
- Time zone: UTC-7 (Mountain (MST))
  - Summer (DST): UTC-6 (MDT)
- ZIP code: 59644
- Area code: 406
- FIPS code: 30-74575
- GNIS feature ID: 2412089
- Website: www.townsendmt.com

Townsend is a city in and the county seat of Broadwater County, Montana, United States. The population was 1,787 at the 2020 census.

== History ==
Lewis and Clark passed through on their expedition in 1805, although the first white settlers, homesteaders, and Civil War veterans in search of gold would not arrive until the late 1860s. In 1883, a railway station was established as businesses were founded supporting gold mining in the region. Townsend was named by railroad officials, in honor of Susan Townsend, the wife of Charles Barstow Wright, president of the Northern Pacific (1875–1879).

Several locations in town are listed on the National Register of Historic Places. St. Joseph's Catholic Mission Church is listed as the oldest standing example of secular Roman Catholic church architecture in Montana. It is now a museum. The State Bank of Townsend was opened in 1899 and still operates as a bank. Valley Masonic Lodge No. 21 was opened in 1875 just north of the town. It was moved to the town in 1884.

== Geography ==
Townsend is located at approximately 3800 feet above sea level. Townsend is 35 miles (56 km) from Helena, the state capital and 35 miles (56 km) from the convergence of the Jefferson, Madison, and Gallatin rivers which form the headwaters of the Missouri River. Nicknamed "the first city on the Missouri River", Townsend sits nearby the southern tip of Canyon Ferry Lake (a part of, and fed by, the Missouri River) a popular recreation destination and Montana's third largest body of water.

The town lies within the Helena National Forest. Near the town is Eagle Guard Station, the oldest administrative log structure in the Forest.

The town is next to the Stone Hill Springs Prehistoric District. The district has many archaeological sites from Native people before Euro-American contact. The numerous separate sites cover over 2,000 unspoiled acres.

An 8 miles (13 km) section of the Crow Creek Water Ditch nearby is on the National Register of Historic Places. The irrigation system was previously used to support gold mining.

According to the United States Census Bureau, the city has a total area of 1.59 square miles (4.12 km^{2}), of which 1.58 square miles (4.09 km^{2}) is land and 0.01 square miles (0.03 km^{2}) is water.

== Demographics ==
Historical population
Census	Pop.	Note	%±
1890	245		—
1900	446		82.0%
1910	759		70.2%
1920	897		18.2%
1930	735		−18.1%
1940	1,309		78.1%
1950	1,316		0.5%
1960	1,528		16.1%
1970	1,371		−10.3%
1980	1,587		15.8%
1990	1,635		3.0%
2000	1,867		14.2%
2010	1,878		0.6%
2020	1,787		−4.8%
U.S. Decennial Census

=== 2020 census ===
As of the 2020 census, Townsend had a population of 1,787. The median age was 46.3 years. 19.6% of residents were under the age of 18 and 26.1% of residents were 65 years of age or older. For every 100 females there were 104.9 males, and for every 100 females age 18 and over there were 109.0 males age 18 and over.

0.0% of residents lived in urban areas, while 100.0% lived in rural areas.

There were 825 households in Townsend, of which 24.8% had children under the age of 18 living in them. Of all households, 40.2% were married-couple households, 27.3% were households with a male householder and no spouse or partner present, and 25.0% were households with a female householder and no spouse or partner present. About 38.3% of all households were made up of individuals and 20.5% had someone living alone who was 65 years of age or older.

There were 901 housing units, of which 8.4% were vacant. The homeowner vacancy rate was 0.9% and the rental vacancy rate was 4.9%.

Racial composition as of the 2020 census
Race	Number	Percent
White	1,659	92.8%
Black or African American	2	0.1%
American Indian and Alaska Native	14	0.8%
Asian	0	0.0%
Native Hawaiian and Other Pacific Islander	0	0.0%
Some other race	10	0.6%
Two or more races	102	5.7%
Hispanic or Latino (of any race)	66	3.7%

=== 2010 census ===
As of the census of 2010, there were 1,878 people, 822 households, and 495 families residing in the city. The population density was 1,188.6 inhabitants per square mile (458.9/km^{2}). There were 888 housing units at an average density of 562.0 per square mile (217.0/km^{2}). The racial makeup of the city was 95.5% White, 0.2% African American, 1.5% Native American, 0.3% Asian, 0.7% from other races, and 1.8% from two or more races. Hispanic or Latino of any race were 2.8% of the population.

There were 822 households, of which 25.8% had children under the age of 18 living with them, 47.9% were married couples living together, 7.9% had a female householder with no husband present, 4.4% had a male householder with no wife present, and 39.8% were non-families. 35.4% of all households were made up of individuals, and 16.5% had someone living alone who was 65 years of age or older. The average household size was 2.22 and the average family size was 2.85.

The median age in the city was 45.7 years. 22% of residents were under the age of 18; 7.6% were between the ages of 18 and 24; 19.5% were from 25 to 44; 28.2% were from 45 to 64; and 22.8% were 65 years of age or older. The gender makeup of the city was 51.1% male and 48.9% female.

=== 2000 census ===
As of the census of 2000, there were 1,867 people, 786 households, and 507 families residing in the city. The population density was 1,176.2 inhabitants per square mile (454.1/km^{2}). There were 847 housing units at an average density of 533.6 per square mile (206.0/km^{2}). The racial makeup of the city was 97.59% White, 0.11% African American, 1.39% Native American, 0.43% from other races, and 0.48% from two or more races. Hispanic or Latino of any race were 1.77% of the population.

There were 786 households, out of which 26.6% had children under the age of 18 living with them, 52.2% were married couples living together, 8.1% had a female householder with no husband present, and 35.4% were non-families. 32.2% of all households were made up of individuals, and 16.5% had someone living alone who was 65 years of age or older. The average household size was 2.32 and the average family size was 2.89.

In the city, the population was spread out, with 23.7% under the age of 18, 6.5% from 18 to 24, 23.7% from 25 to 44, 23.5% from 45 to 64, and 22.5% who were 65 years of age or older. The median age was 43 years. For every 100 females, there were 100.1 males. For every 100 females age 18 and over, there were 100.6 males.

The median income for a household in the city was $26,820, and the median income for a family was $32,679. Males had a median income of $26,859 versus $19,375 for females. The per capita income for the city was $13,674. About 10.1% of families and 13.2% of the population were below the poverty line, including 19.5% of those under age 18 and 9.6% of those age 65 or over.

== Climate ==
Townsend experiences a semi-arid climate (Köppen BSk) with cold, dry winters and hot, wetter summers.

Climate data for Townsend, Montana (1991–2020 normals, extremes 1948–present)
Month	Jan	Feb	Mar	Apr	May	Jun	Jul	Aug	Sep	Oct	Nov	Dec	Year
Record high °F (°C)	64 (18)	72 (22)	77 (25)	88 (31)	94 (34)	100 (38)	101 (38)	105 (41)	99 (37)	89 (32)	75 (24)	69 (21)	105 (41)
Mean daily maximum °F (°C)	33.9 (1.1)	38.7 (3.7)	49.4 (9.7)	58.2 (14.6)	67.0 (19.4)	74.1 (23.4)	83.4 (28.6)	82.6 (28.1)	72.7 (22.6)	58.5 (14.7)	43.7 (6.5)	33.8 (1.0)	58.0 (14.4)
Daily mean °F (°C)	23.8 (−4.6)	27.6 (−2.4)	36.5 (2.5)	44.6 (7.0)	53.2 (11.8)	60.4 (15.8)	67.5 (19.7)	66.2 (19.0)	57.2 (14.0)	45.2 (7.3)	33.0 (0.6)	24.0 (−4.4)	44.9 (7.2)
Mean daily minimum °F (°C)	13.7 (−10.2)	16.5 (−8.6)	23.5 (−4.7)	31.0 (−0.6)	39.4 (4.1)	46.8 (8.2)	51.7 (10.9)	49.7 (9.8)	41.6 (5.3)	31.9 (−0.1)	22.2 (−5.4)	14.2 (−9.9)	31.8 (−0.1)
Record low °F (°C)	−39 (−39)	−38 (−39)	−37 (−38)	0 (−18)	13 (−11)	19 (−7)	34 (1)	25 (−4)	12 (−11)	−11 (−24)	−29 (−34)	−37 (−38)	−39 (−39)
Average precipitation inches (mm)	0.28 (7.1)	0.28 (7.1)	0.42 (11)	0.85 (22)	1.78 (45)	2.51 (64)	1.21 (31)	1.10 (28)	0.78 (20)	0.65 (17)	0.39 (9.9)	0.30 (7.6)	10.55 (268)
Average snowfall inches (cm)	4.4 (11)	3.2 (8.1)	4.0 (10)	2.3 (5.8)	0.1 (0.25)	0.0 (0.0)	0.0 (0.0)	0.0 (0.0)	0.0 (0.0)	1.4 (3.6)	3.9 (9.9)	4.4 (11)	23.7 (60)
Average precipitation days (≥ 0.01 in)	4.7	4.8	5.3	7.5	10.8	12.3	8.6	7.6	6.0	5.0	5.1	5.1	82.8
Average snowy days (≥ 0.1 in)	4.8	3.8	3.3	1.8	0.2	0.0	0.0	0.0	0.0	0.6	3.3	4.7	22.5
Source: NOAA

== Government ==
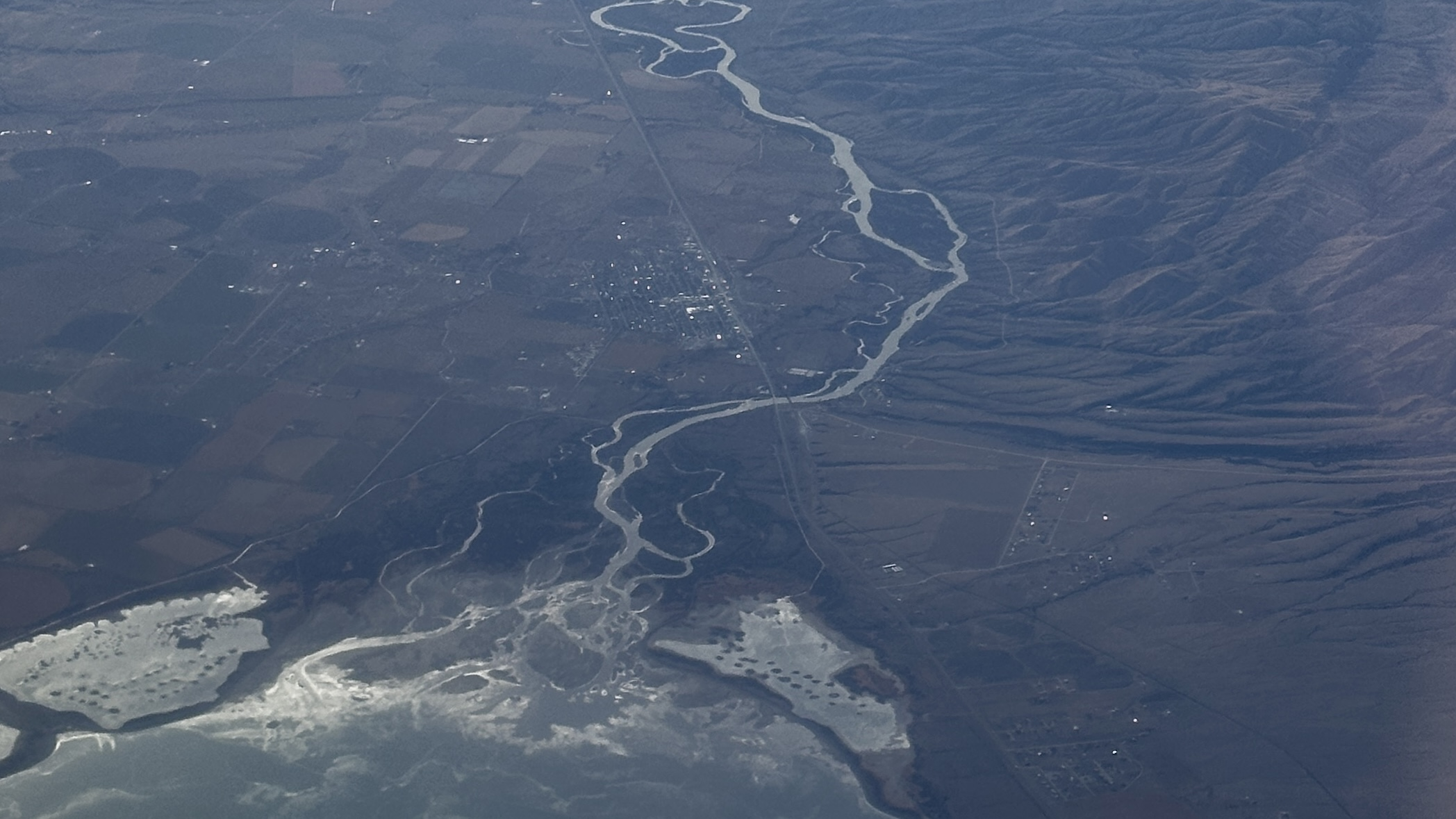
Aerial view of Townsend and the Missouri River in 2024.

Vickie Rauser became Mayor in 2023. The town has a City Council with three wards. Each ward has 2 elected members.

== Education ==
It is within the Townsend K-12 Schools school district. The Townsend School District educates students from kindergarten to 12th grade. For the 2021-2022 school year, 667 students attended. The mascot for Broadwater High School is the Bulldogs.

Broadwater Community Library is located in Townsend.

== Media ==
Two FM radio stations are licensed in Townsend. KDGZ-LP is operated by the school district. KIMO is owned by the Montana Radio Company and plays a country music format.

== Infrastructure ==
U.S. Route 287 runs north to south next to town. U.S. Route 12 runs east to west.

Townsend Airport is a public use airport located 2 miles east of town.

== Notable people ==
- Ben Clopton - cartoon artist
- Patrick Duffy - actor who played Bobby Ewing in Dallas and was also in Step By Step, was born in Townsend
- Susie Hedalen - 18th Montana Superintendent of Public Instruction
- Esther Reed - identity thief, was born in Townsend
