= Ibsenhuset =

Coordinates: 59°12′27″N 9°36′19″E

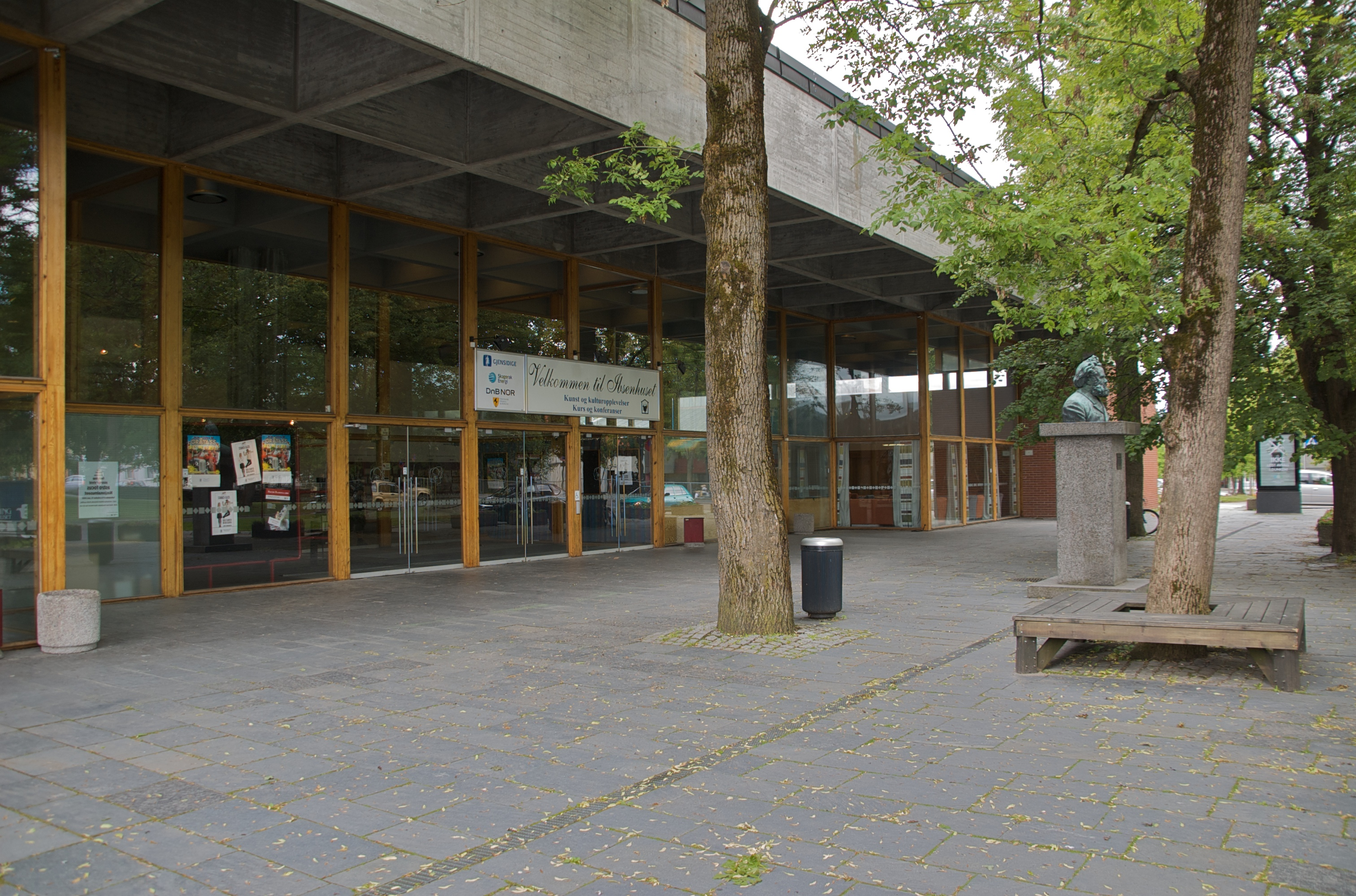
- Interactive map of the Ibsenhuset area

General information
- Type: Arts complex
- Architectural style: Modern
- Location: Skien, Norway
- Opened: 9 September 1973
- Owner: Skien municipality

Technical details
- Structural system: Concrete and glass with wooden framework

Website
- www.ibsenhuset.no

Ibsenhuset is a Norwegian cultural centre in the city of Skien, Telemark county. The building houses several facilities for concerts, theater performances, opera, exhibits, conferences, courses, meetings and other events. There are also a restaurant and the town's main library in the building. International and national artists and entertainers have performed at Ibsenhuset. The name Ibsenhuset is derived from Henrik Ibsen's last name and from "huset", Norwegian for a house or building. Ibsen was born in Skien 20 March 1828 and lived in different locations in town until he was 15 years old. The Norwegian Ibsen award is annually presented at Ibsenhuset to promising playwrights.

Ibsenhuset may also refer to another "Ibsenhuset" in a museum in the Norwegian town of Grimstad, or to some of Ibsen's various homes.

== History ==
The building was opened on 9 September 1973 in downtown Skien as the most modern culture and arts centre in Norway. Planning for the facility had begun shortly after World War II at the initiative of the labour unions in the city. Ibsenhuset was named after the famous Norwegian poet and playwright Henrik Ibsen. The building was fully renovated in 2013, with economic support from the city.

== Operation ==
The cultural centre is operated by a private company, Ibsenhuset AS, and it is economically supported by the city and the county, with a local political council contributing to the operation. In 2013 the centre employed 14 persons. The goal of the operation is to maintain an activity and arts centre for the local community population in Grenland and Telemark. The centre is also supported financially by local firms as sponsors.

== Facilities ==
The building has an 800-square-metre (8,600 sq ft) foyer which houses a ticket counter, a bar, a kiosk and entry to all the larger halls. The foyer is also used for art installations and small concerts. Skien's art association has its base in the foyer and hosts gallery openings and exhibits there. All of the main rooms in the building are named after elements of Henrik Ibsens' writings. The building currently houses large concert hall, "Dovregubbens hall" (In the Hall of the Mountain King), accommodating 800 guests; the smaller "Peer Gynt hall" takes up to 250 people. There are audio studio facilities, and the city's culture school has rooms for instruction and rehearsals. The main city public library is also located in the building. A restaurant in the building also offers catering services for events. Future projects currently being discussed include further expansion and potential combination with a hotel.
