= New Beginnings (sculpture) =

Statue by Larry Anderson in Tacoma, Washington, U.S.

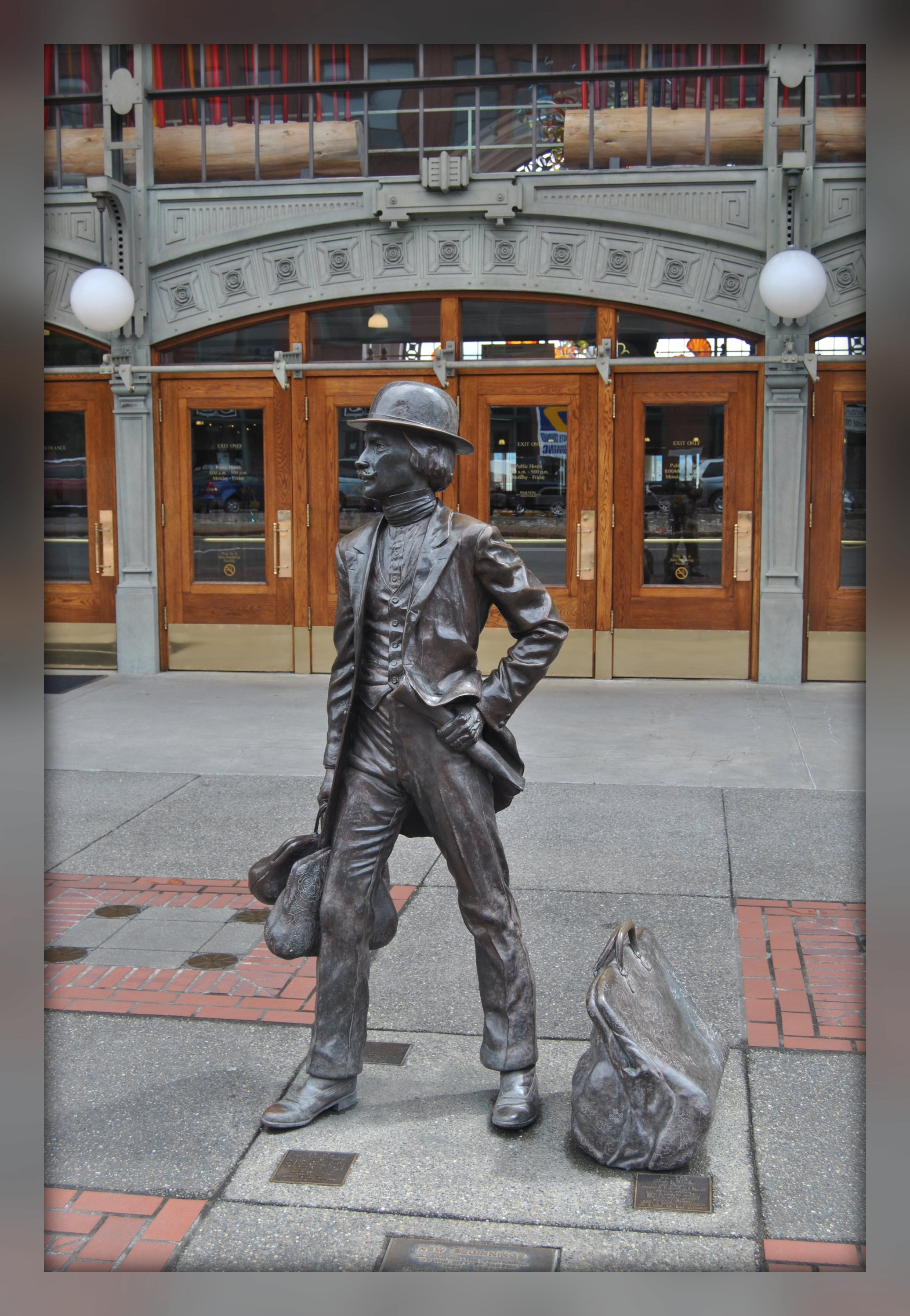
- The statue in 2011
- Artist: Larry Anderson
- Location: Tacoma, Washington, U.S.
- 47°14′45.3″N 122°26′12″W

New Beginnings is a bronze sculpture by Larry Anderson, installed at Tacoma, Washington's Union Station, in the United States.

== Description ==
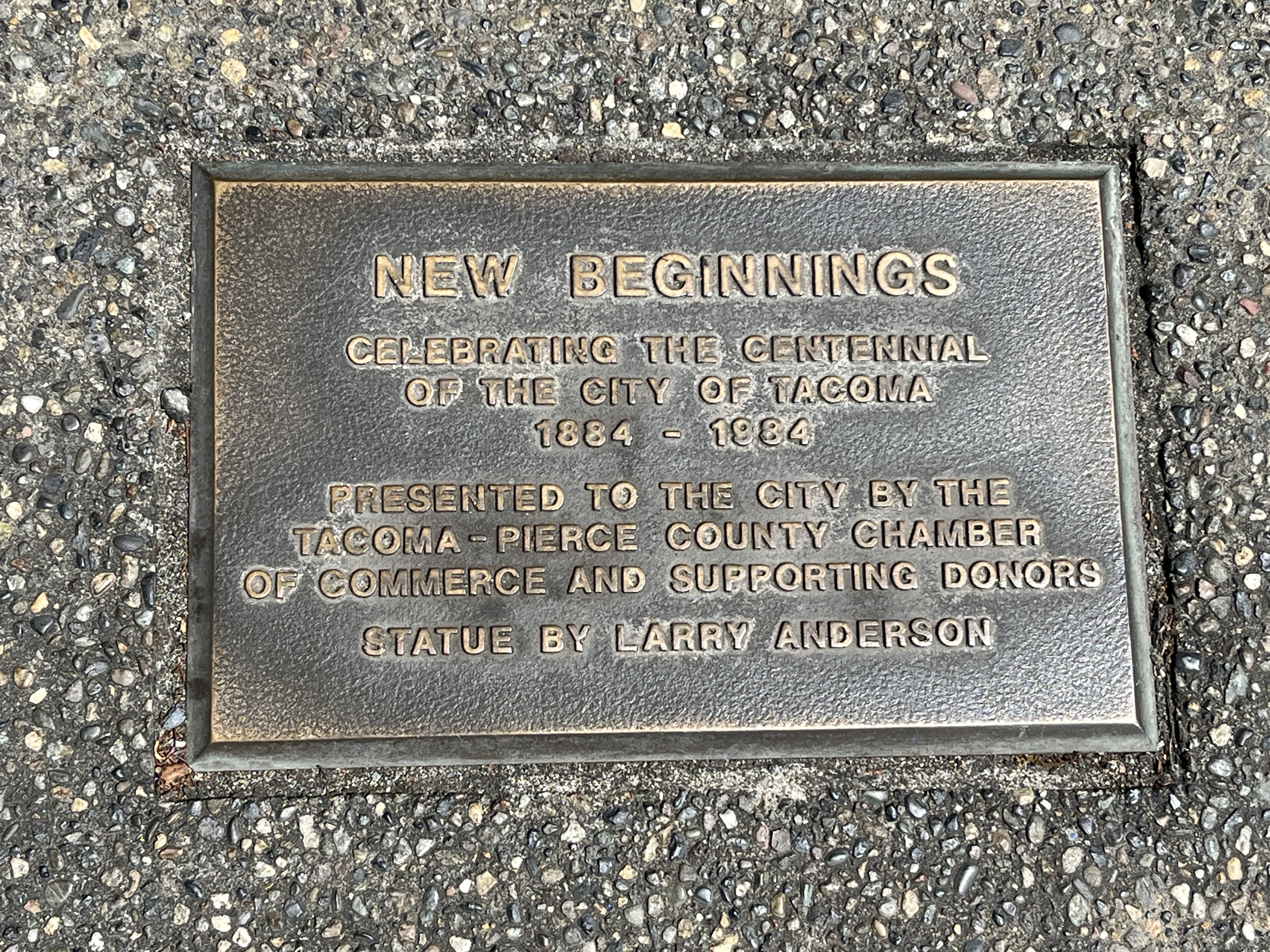
Plaque for the sculpture, 2023

Larry Anderson's bronze sculpture New Beginnings is installed on Pacific Avenue outside Union Station in downtown Tacoma. The artwork depicts a man arriving in the city and wearing a bowler hat. It has also been described as "an historical representation of individuals of entrepreneurial spirit".

Steve Dunkelberger by SouthSoundTalk said the statue "bears a striking resemblance" to George Francis Train.

== History ==
The work was presented to the city and dedicated in 1984, marking Tacoma's centennial.

== Reception ==
Dunkelberger said the statue "provides a fitting tribute to Tacoma's quirky past that remains just as quirky today".

== See also ==
- 1984 in art
