= Charles Barstow Wright =

American financier

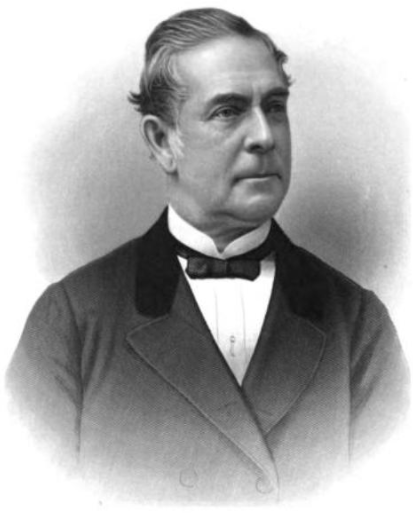
- Born: January 8, 1822; Bradford County, Pennsylvania
- Died: March 24, 1898 (aged 76); Philadelphia, Pennsylvania
- Occupation: Financier
- Spouses: Cordelia Williams (m. 1848) Susan Townsend (m. 1858)

Charles Barstow Wright (January 8, 1822 – March 24, 1898) was an American financier.

== Biography ==
Wright was born in Bradford County, Pennsylvania on January 8, 1822. He started in business at 15, and at 19 was taken as a partner by his employer. In 1843, he received from the Towanda Bank a trust of landed interests in the then small town of Chicago, and in two years, he not only fulfilled this mission successfully but realized handsome profits in Chicago real estate for himself.

He married Cordelia Williams in 1848. In 1858, he remarried to Susan Townsend. Townsend, Montana is named after Wright's second wife.

In 1863, he engaged actively in developing the petroleum interests of Pennsylvania. In 1870, as director and afterward as president, he undertook the work of pushing the Northern Pacific Railroad to completion. After the road had been built to the Missouri River and eastward from the Pacific Ocean about 100 miles, Jay Cooke and Co., the fiscal agents, failed during the Panic of 1873, and the completed parts were not paying expenses. Wright afterward assisted in the reorganization by which the road was completed to Puget Sound.

Wright served as president of the Northern Pacific from 1875 until 1879 and was instrumental in deciding on Tacoma as its western terminus.

In 1874, he took part in founding the city of Tacoma, Washington. There he endowed the Annie Wright Seminary for girls (named for his daughter), and Washington College for boys, and was noted for his generosity to young men.

He died at his home in Philadelphia on March 24, 1898.

Charles Wright Academy in University Place was named in his honor, as was Tacoma's Wright Park Arboretum.
