= Tollefson Plaza =

Plaza in Tacoma, Washington, U.S.

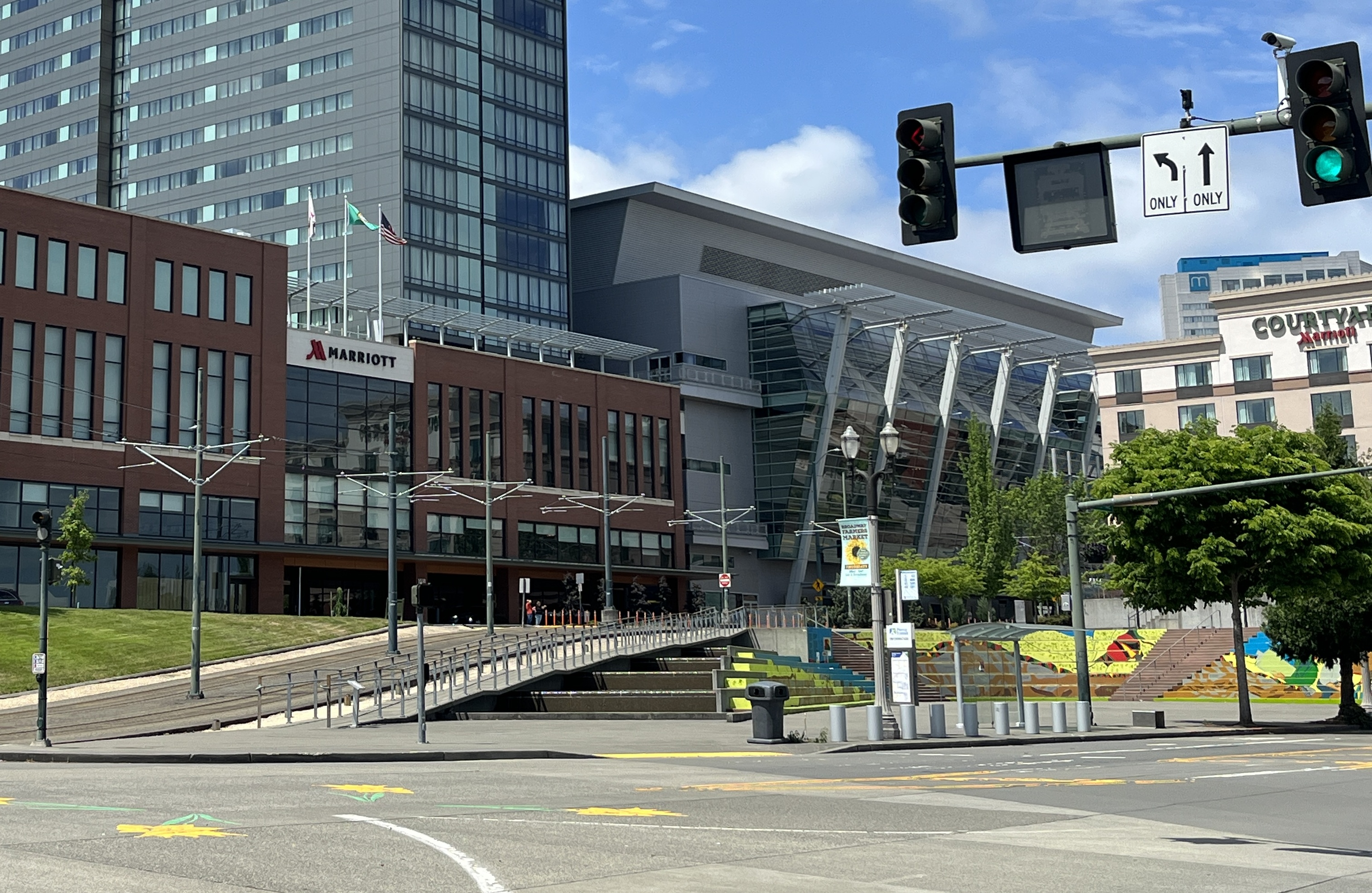
- The plaza in 2023
- Location: Tacoma, Washington, U.S.
- Location within Washington (state)
- Coordinates: 47°14′52″N 122°26′16″W

Tollefson Plaza is a plaza in Tacoma, Washington, United States.

== Description ==
Shaun Peterson's sculpture Welcome Figure was installed in the plaza in September 2010. The 24-foot (7.3 m) tall cedar artwork depicts a standing Salish woman with her arms outstretched, welcoming others. Isaac Peterson of 1899 magazine said, "The carving's simple geometry is refreshing, a true masterpiece of native woodcarving at the center of town instead of the usual elegiac bronze."

The plaza has a Black Lives Matter mural; Dionne Bonner was lead artist of the project, which received financial support from the city and the Tacoma Art Museum. Installed in August 2022, the mural has been described as the Tacoma's first to commemorate the movement.

== History ==
Tollefson Plaza has hosted demonstrations and other events, and was used as a film site for stunt driving in 2015. In 2020, the winter light art festival Tacoma Light Trail brought an interactive exhibit, musicians, poets, and other performers to the plaza. 2022 saw a Juneteenth celebration and an "anti-transgender" rally, which drew counterprotestors.

The plaza has also hosted food trucks and an ice rink during the holiday season.
