= Fisherman's Daughter (sculpture) =

Statue in Tacoma, Washington, U.S.

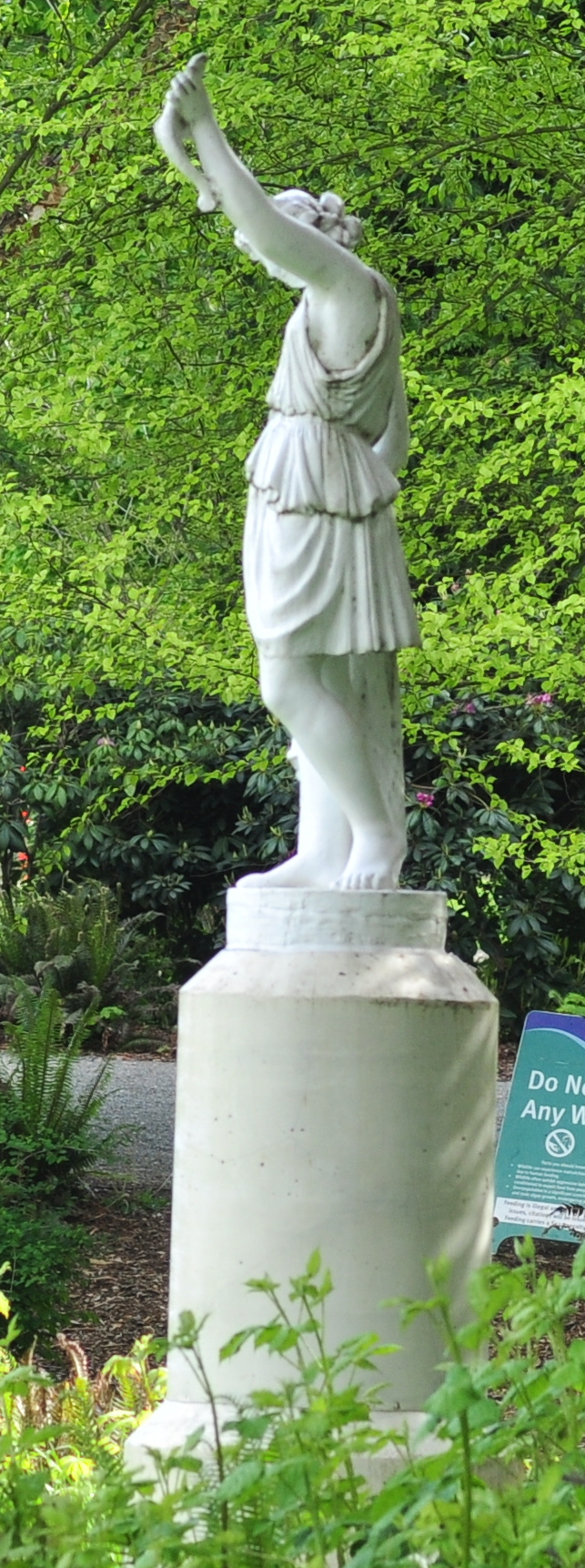
- The sculpture in 2017
- Location: Tacoma, Washington, U.S.
- 47°15′41.2″N 122°27′0.3″W

Fisherman's Daughter is a sculpture in Tacoma, Washington's Wright Park, in the United States.

== Description ==
Fisherman's Daughter (also known as The Lady of the Lake) is a statue of a woman in Tacoma's Wright Park Arboretum. The sculpture is installed on an island within the park.

== History ==
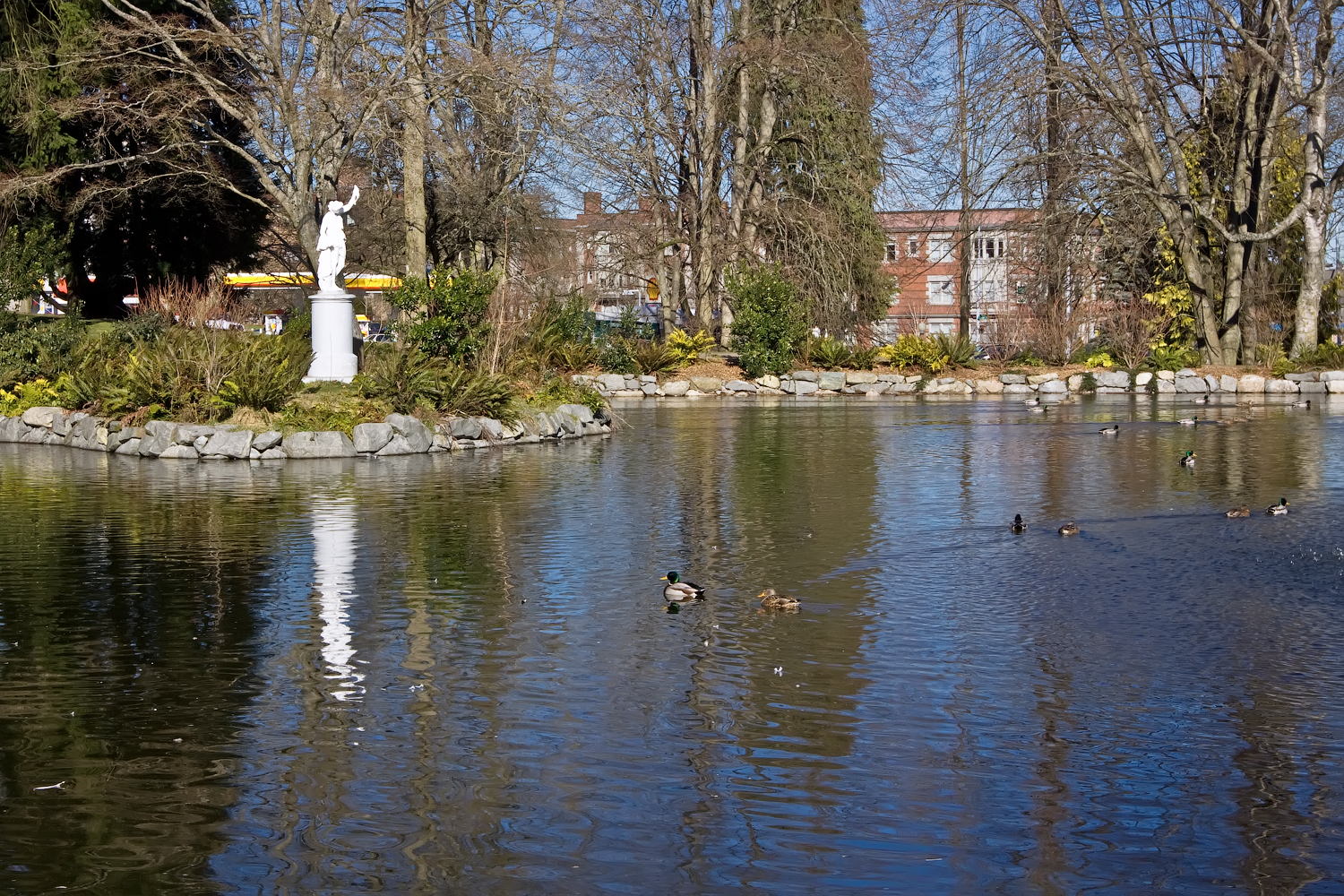
The statue in 2012

Local businessman Clinton P. Ferry acquired the statue in Genoa, Italy, in 1891, during the park's development.

The sculpture was restored by artist Lynn Di Nino, in order to repair damage caused by vandalism. According to the Tacoma Daily Index, "She fashioned the lips and nose of the ... statue in the likeness of those of the maiden statues located at the Division street entry." The base was replaced in 2013.

== See also ==
- List of public art in Tacoma, Washington
