= Hai Ying Wu =

Chinese American sculptor

- Born: China
- Education: Sichuan Fine Arts Institute
- Known for: art, memorials
- Notable work: Seattle Fallen Fire Fighters Memorial, Auto-Lite Strike Memorial
- Movement: Socialist realism

Hai Ying Wu (also known as Jason Wu) is a Chinese American sculptor best known for his firefighter memorials. and his memorial commemorating the Auto-Lite Strike in Toledo, Ohio.

A native of China, Wu received his degree in sculpture from the Sichuan Fine Arts Institute, and became staff sculptor for the city of Chengdu on the Chengdu Public Arts Commission. He worked primarily in public art and in the "socialist realist" genre. A large number of his public art works can be seen in Chengdu. He participated in the Tiananmen Square protests of 1989, and was caught in the square when the Chinese military attacked the demonstrators. He emigrated to the United States later that same year, and in time became a U.S. citizen. He worked in construction and as a dishwasher before enrolling in the University of Washington School of Art. He graduated with a Master of Fine Arts degree. For his master's thesis, he designed a memorial to 19th-century Chinese railroad workers which was later installed in a park in Tacoma, Washington.

As of 2007, he divided his time between his home in Everett, Washington, and China.

Wu is best known for sculpting the Seattle Fallen Fire Fighters Memorial in Seattle's Pioneer Square. A design competition was held among all interested students in the UW School of Arts, and Wu's design was chosen. He has erected similar memorials throughout the Pacific Northwest. He also created the Auto-Lite Strike Memorial in Toledo, which commemorates the violent United Auto Workers strike of 1934. His work for Compass Health in Everett, Washington, was his first sculpture to focus on children.

== Public works ==
Among Wu's public works are:

- "Crane and Turtle" located at North Shore Health Center, Bothell, Washington
- "Dance" in Lynnwood, Washington
- "Emerging" in Renton, Washington
- "The First Pitch" in Redmond, Washington
- "Hide and Seek" at Imagine Children's Museum Collection, Everett, Washington
- "Children Crossing a Stream" at Luther Children's Crisis Facility at Compass Health, Everett, Washington
- "Migration" in Bend, Oregon
- "Mushroom Lanterns” (four separate pieces), a collaboration with Michiko Tanaka, in Seattle, Washington
- "Northglenn Veterans Memorial" in Northglenn, Colorado
- "Seattle Fallen Firefighter's Memorial" in Pioneer Square, Seattle, Washington
- "Team Work" in Glendale, Arizona
