= List of bridges on the National Register of Historic Places in Montana =

This is a list of bridges and tunnels on the National Register of Historic Places in the U.S. state of Montana.

Name	Image	Built	Listed	Location	County	Type
Bad Route Creek Bridge		1922	2011-4-28	Fallon vicinity 46°58′24″N 105°8′0″W	Dawson	Reinforced Concrete Bridges in Montana, 1900–1958 MPS
Bell Street Bridge		1926	1988-02-03	Glendive; 47°6′20″N 104°43′9″W	Dawson	Warren through trusses
Big Horn River Bridge		1933	2010-01-04	Custer	Treasure	
Bluewater Creek Bridge		1913	2011-4-28	Fromberg vicinity 45°22′10″N 108°52′56″W	Carbon	Reinforced Concrete Bridges in Montana, 1900–1958 MPS
Bridges of Poindexter Slough		1936	2025-07-07	Dillon; 45°10′57.4″N 112°40′49.1″W -->	Beaverhead	Concrete tee-beam
Browne's Bridge		1863	2010-01-04	Glen	Beaverhead	
Carbella Bridge		1918	2010-01-04	Gardiner; 45°12′16.25″N 110°54′5.61″W	Park	
Carter Bridge		1921	2011-4-28	Livingston vicinity 45°35′49″N 110°34′2″W	Park	Reinforced Concrete Bridges in Montana, 1900–1958 MPS
Conley Street Bridge		1913	2011-4-28	Deer Lodge; 46°23′26″N 112°44′14″W	Powell	Reinforced Concrete Bridges in Montana, 1900–1958 MPS
Cottonwood Creek Bridge		1934	2014-03-14	Ismay; 46°27′23.9″N 104°47′19.0″W	Fallon	Timber stringer
Dearborn River High Bridge	Dearborn River High Bridge	1897	2003-12-18	Augusta; 47°16′52″N 112°23′25″W	Lewis and Clark	Pratt half-deck truss
Flathead River Bridge		1912	2010-7-17	Columbia Falls vicinity	Flathead	
Forsyth Bridge		1905, 1939	1990-02-12	Forsyth; 46°15′57″N 106°41′31″W	Rosebud	Pennsylvania truss bridge
Fort Benton Bridge	Fort Benton Bridge	1888	1980-08-06	Fort Benton; 47°49′2″N 110°39′38″W	Chouteau	
Hardy Bridge	Hardy Bridge	1931	2010-01-04	Cascade	Cascade	
Fromberg Concrete Arch Bridge	Fromberg Concrete Arch Bridge	1914	1993-01-28	Fromberg; 45°23′31″N 108°53′39″W	Carbon	Concrete arch bridge
Gardiner Bridge		1930	2025-02-06	Gardiner; 45°01′56.3″N 110°42′19.8″W	Park	Pratt deck truss
Huntley Bridge			2012-4-26	Huntley vicinity 45°54′14″N 108°19′4″W	Yellowstone	Montana's Steel Stringer and Steel Girder Bridges MPS
Hutchins Bridge		1902	1999-03-18	Cameron; 44°53′20″N 111°34′47″W	Madison	Pratt Through Truss
Joliet Bridge		1901	1986-05-02	Joliet; 45°29′14″N 108°58′32″W	Carbon	Pratt through truss
Kearney Rapids Bridge		1911, 1931	1994-07-22	Bigfork	Flathead	Pratt through truss
Lewis and Clark Bridge	Lewis and Clark Bridge	1930	1997-11-24	Wolf Point; 48°4′2″N 105°32′6″W	McCone	Pennsylvania Through Truss
Little Blackfoot River Bridge		1914	2010-01-04	Avon	Powell	
Locate Creek Bridge		1901	2012-4-26	Miles City vicinity 46°28′30″N 105°18′17″W	Custer	Montana's Steel Stringer and Steel Girder Bridges MPS
Marias River Bridge		1936	2012-4-26	Shelby vicinity 48°25′38″N 111°53′26″W	Toole	Montana's Steel Stringer and Steel Girder Bridges MPS
Middle Fork Bridge		1920	2002-09-23	West Glacier	Flathead	
Milk River Bridge			2025-12-29	Malta; 48°21′49.5″N 107°52′26.6″W	Phillips	Parker through truss
Missouri River Bridge	Missouri River Bridge	1904	2010-01-04	Wolf Creek; 47°01′08″N 112°00′44″W	Lewis and Clark	
Morel Bridge		1914, 1959	2000-12-12	Anaconda; 46°9′28″N 112°46′16″W	Deer Lodge	Rainbow Arch Bridge
Morelli Bridge		1881	2022-12-08	Helena; 46°35′08.4″N 112°02′40.7″W	Lewis and Clark	Timber stringer
Mossman Overpass			2012-4-26	Laurel vicinity	Yellowstone	Montana's Steel Stringer and Steel Girder Bridges MPS
Musselshell River Bridge		1911	2025-12-29	Ryegate; 46°18′05.2″N 109°12′27.8″W -->	Golden Valley	Warren through truss
Natural Pier Bridge		1917	2010-01-04	Alberton	Mineral	
Orange Street Underpass		1939	2012-4-26	Missoula; 46°52′39″N 113°59′43″W	Missoula	Montana's Steel Stringer and Steel Girder Bridges MPS
Powder River Bridge		1946	2010-01-04	Terry	Prairie	
Ptarmigan Tunnel	Ptarmigan Tunnel	1930	1986-02-14	West Glacier; 48°51′13″N 113°42′24″W	Flathead	
Pugsley Bridge		1951	2020-11-09	Chester; 48°17′27.6″N 111°02′47.8″W	Liberty	Wire suspension
Fred Robinson Bridge		1959	2012-4-26	Lewistown vicinity 47°37′51″N 108°41′6″W	Fergus/Phillips	Montana's Steel Stringer and Steel Girder Bridges MPS
Scenic Bridge	Scenic Bridge	1928	2010-01-04	Tarkio	Mineral	
Sheep Creek Bridge		1933	2011-4-28	Wolf Creek vicinity 46°58′39″N 112°4′53″W	Lewis and Clark	Reinforced Concrete Bridges in Montana, 1900–1958 MPS
Shonkin Creek Bridge		1928	2012-4-26	Geraldine vicinity 47°33′57″N 110°33′11″W	Chouteau	Montana's Steel Stringer and Steel Girder Bridges MPS
Swan River Bridge		1911	2015-08-03	Bigfork; 48°03′33.5″N 114°04′21.7″W	Flathead	Pratt through truss (Replaced 2025)
Tenth Street Bridge	Tenth Street Bridge	1920	1996-04-25	Great Falls; 47°31′7″N 111°17′22″W	Cascade	open spandrel bridge
Theodore Roosevelt Memorial Bridge		1912	2006-12-27	Troy; 48°28′12″N 115°53′11″W	Lincoln	Parker-through truss
Toston Bridge	Toston Bridge	1919, 1920	2005-07-20	Toston; 46°10′19″N 111°26′34″W	Broadwater	Warren through truss
O.S. Warden Bridge		1951	2012-4-26	Great Falls; 47°29′36″N 111°18′46″W	Cascade	Montana's Steel Stringer and Steel Girder Bridges MPS
Williams Street Bridge		1894, 1895	2006-11-29	Helena; 46°36′19″N 112°5′14″W	Lewis and Clark	Pratt Pony truss. Demolished and replaced 2010.
Yellowstone River Bridge		1944	2010-01-04	Fallon	LePrairie	
