= National Register of Historic Places listings in Dawson County, Montana =

Location of Dawson County in Montana

This is a list of the National Register of Historic Places listings in Dawson County, Montana. It is intended to be a complete list of the properties and districts on the National Register of Historic Places in Dawson County, Montana, United States. The locations of National Register properties and districts for which the latitude and longitude coordinates are included below, may be seen in a map.

There are 13 properties and districts listed on the National Register in the county, including 1 National Historic Landmark.

This National Park Service list is complete through NPS recent listings posted March 14, 2025.

== Listings county-wide ==
	Name on the Register	Image	Date listed	Location	City or town	Description
1	Bad Route Creek Bridge		April 28, 2011 (#11000224)	Milepost 20 on County Road 261; 46°53′23″N 105°00′36″W	Fallon vicinity	Reinforced Concrete Bridges in Montana, 1900-1958 MPS
2	Bell Street Bridge	Bell Street Bridge	February 3, 1988 (#87002517)	W. Bell St. 47°06′20″N 104°43′09″W	Glendive	
3	Blackstock Residence	Blackstock Residence	February 3, 1988 (#87002515)	217 W. Towne; 47°06′21″N 104°42′51″W	Glendive	
4	First Methodist Episcopal Church and Parsonage	First Methodist Episcopal Church and Parsonage	February 3, 1988 (#87002513)	209 N. Kendrick; 47°06′22″N 104°42′49″W	Glendive	
5	Glendive City Water Filtration Plant	Glendive City Water Filtration Plant	February 3, 1988 (#87002512)	420 W. Bell St. 47°06′21″N 104°43′02″W	Glendive	
6	Glendive Heat, Light and Power Company Power Plant	Glendive Heat, Light and Power Company Power Plant	February 3, 1988 (#87002511)	Clough St. 47°06′18″N 104°43′02″W	Glendive	
7	Hagen Site	Hagen Site	October 15, 1966 (#66000432)	Address restricted	Glendive	
8	Charles Krug House	Charles Krug House	June 3, 1976 (#76001122)	103 N. Douglas St. 47°06′21″N 104°42′59″W	Glendive	
9	McCone Residence		February 3, 1988 (#87002509)	218 W. Towne; 47°06′23″N 104°42′50″W	Glendive	Probably demolished.
10	Merrill Avenue Historic District	Merrill Avenue Historic District	February 3, 1988 (#87002508)	Western side of Merrill Ave. between S. Douglas St. and W. Clement St. and the eastern side of Merrill Ave. between W. Towne and W. Clement; 47°06′18″N 104°42′45″W	Glendive	
11	Northern Pacific Railroad Settling Tanks	Northern Pacific Railroad Settling Tanks	February 3, 1988 (#87002507)	Towne and Clough Sts. 47°06′25″N 104°43′02″W	Glendive	
12	Sacred Heart Church	Sacred Heart Church	February 3, 1988 (#87002504)	316 W. Benham; 47°06′28″N 104°42′51″W	Glendive	
13	US Post Office	US Post Office	February 3, 1988 (#87002503)	221 N. Kendrick; 47°06′24″N 104°42′47″W	Glendive	

== See also ==
- List of National Historic Landmarks in Montana
- National Register of Historic Places listings in Montana
