= Toston =

Toston may refer to:

- Keith Toston (born 1987), footballer
- Roosevelt Toston, journalist
- Toston, Montana
- Toston Bridge
- Toston Dam
- Tostones
- Tostón Lighthouse
