= Saugus =

Saugus may refer to:

== Places ==
- Saugus, Massachusetts, U.S.
- Saugus, Santa Clarita, California, U.S., named after its sister city in Massachusetts
- Saugus, Montana, U.S.
- Saugus River, in Massachusetts, U.S.

== Education ==
- Saugus High School (California), U.S.
  - 2019 Saugus High School shooting
- Saugus Middle-High School, Massachusetts, U.S.
- Saugus Public Schools, Massachusetts, U.S.
- Saugus Union School District, California, U.S.

== Other uses ==
- USS Saugus, the name of several ships

== See also ==
- Saugus Advertiser, newspaper covering the town of Saugus, Massachusetts, U.S.
- Saugus Iron Works National Historic Site, Massachusetts, U.S.
- Saugus Speedway, racetrack in Saugus, Santa Clarita, California, U.S.
- Saugus Town Hall, in Saugus, Massachusetts, U.S.
- Saugus train wreck, in Montana, 1938
