= List of mountains in McCone County, Montana =

There are at least 26 named mountains in McCone County, Montana.

- Andrews Hill, 47°48′06″N 106°11′12″W, el. 2,598 feet (792 m)
- Bald Butte, 47°51′45″N 106°06′05″W, el. 2,628 feet (801 m)
- Big Butte, 47°51′16″N 106°03′30″W, el. 2,556 feet (779 m)
- Big Heaven, 47°33′12″N 105°58′05″W, el. 2,582 feet (787 m)
- Bonhoff Butte, 47°39′35″N 106°03′37″W, el. 2,812 feet (857 m)
- Caprock Butte, 47°57′18″N 106°13′02″W, el. 2,628 feet (801 m)
- Chalk Butte, 47°06′02″N 105°57′22″W, el. 2,982 feet (909 m)
- Coal Hill, 47°56′52″N 106°14′49″W, el. 2,769 feet (844 m)
- Cobb Hill, 47°27′14″N 106°07′39″W, el. 2,749 feet (838 m)
- Corner Butte, 47°49′04″N 106°04′08″W, el. 2,464 feet (751 m)
- Deadman Butte, 48°01′42″N 106°18′07″W, el. 2,628 feet (801 m)
- Devils Table Rock, 47°32′36″N 106°03′23″W, el. 2,749 feet (838 m)
- Goat Mountain, 47°50′39″N 106°11′41″W, el. 2,657 feet (810 m)
- Indian Hill, 47°59′11″N 106°18′12″W, el. 2,726 feet (831 m)
- Little Heaven, 47°32′39″N 105°54′47″W, el. 2,779 feet (847 m)
- Lower Summit, 47°13′30″N 105°31′23″W, el. 2,920 feet (890 m)
- Lucky Hill, 47°53′47″N 106°16′17″W, el. 2,648 feet (807 m)
- Lytle Hill, 47°51′26″N 106°02′59″W, el. 2,520 feet (770 m)
- Maxwell Hill, 47°57′06″N 106°04′10″W, el. 2,431 feet (741 m)
- McDonald Butte, 47°30′01″N 106°03′02″W, el. 2,779 feet (847 m)
- Rocky Butte, 47°49′04″N 106°04′23″W, el. 2,510 feet (770 m)
- Stony Butte Hill, 47°19′46″N 105°45′44″W, el. 2,743 feet (836 m)
- Teton Butte, 47°51′05″N 106°05′17″W, el. 2,490 feet (760 m)
- Vanderhoof Hill, 47°48′33″N 106°02′58″W, el. 2,480 feet (760 m)
- Westland Hill, 47°51′32″N 106°10′56″W, el. 2,651 feet (808 m)
- Willis Buttes, 47°50′12″N 106°05′08″W, el. 2,589 feet (789 m)

== See also ==
- List of mountains in Montana
- List of mountain ranges in Montana
