= Scenic Bridge =

- U.S. National Register of Historic Places
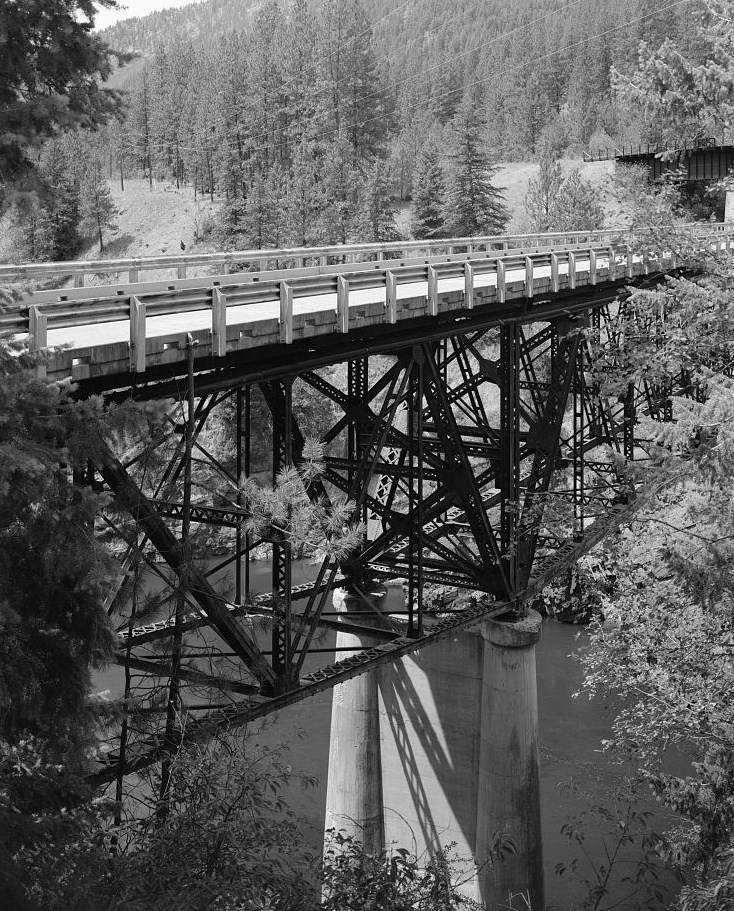

- Location within Montana Location within the United States
- Location: Milepost 0 on Old U.S. Route 10 West, about 4 miles (6.4 km) east of Tarkio, Montana
- Coordinates: 47°01′12.4″N 114°39′25.5″W
- Area: 2 acres (0.81 ha)
- Built: 1928
- Built by: William P. Roscoe Company
- Architectural style: Pratt deck truss
- MPS: Montana's Historic Steel Truss Bridges
- NRHP reference No.: 09001183
- Added to NRHP: January 4, 2010

The Scenic Bridge crossing Clark Fork River about 4 miles (6.4 km) east of Tarkio in Mineral County, Montana, was built in 1928. It is located at Milepost 0 on Old U.S. Route 10 West. The bridge has also been denoted 24MN304 and MDT No. L31012000+08. It was listed on the National Register of Historic Places in 2010.

The bridge is a riveted Pratt deck truss bridge. It has three main spans upon reinforced concrete abutments and piers. The bridge is 421 feet (128 m) long in total, with four 19-foot (5.8 m) approach spans, two 77-foot (23 m) deck truss spans, and a 191-foot (58 m) deck truss main span. It is 25 feet (7.6 m) wide, supporting a 24-foot (7.3 m) roadway.

This Pratt deck truss design was chosen by state staff for relatively rare circumstances during 1928 to 1932, after which a version of a Warren truss design was used.

== See also ==
- List of bridges documented by the Historic American Engineering Record in Montana
- List of bridges on the National Register of Historic Places in Montana
