= McCone Residence =

Historic house in Montana, United States

- U.S. National Register of Historic Places
- Location within Montana Location within the United States
- Location: 218 W. Towne, Glendive, Montana
- Coordinates: 47°6′23″N 104°42′50″W
- Area: less than one acre
- Built: 1893-1903
- Built by: Morton, John
- MPS: Glendive MRA
- NRHP reference No.: 87002509
- Added to NRHP: February 3, 1988

The McCone Residence in Glendive in Dawson County, Montana was listed on the National Register of Historic Places in 1988.

It is a small one-story L-shaped house built during 1893 to 1903, probably by carpenter John A. Morton, and was expanded during 1903-1905 and again during 1905–1910. It was home in 1909 to George McCone (b.1854), a pioneer settler in this area. He had been mail carrier between (Oklahoma's?) Fort Reno and Fort Sill in 1877, was mail carrier between Bismarck, North Dakota and Fort Keogh in 1881, and was mail carrier between Glendive and Fort Buford and Wolf Point in 1882. He was on the first board of county commissioners for Dawson County, and he is the namesake of McCone County (created in 1919).

It was listed on the National Register as a result of a study of multiple historic resources in Glendive which also listed several others.
