= Hutchins Bridge =

- U.S. National Register of Historic Places
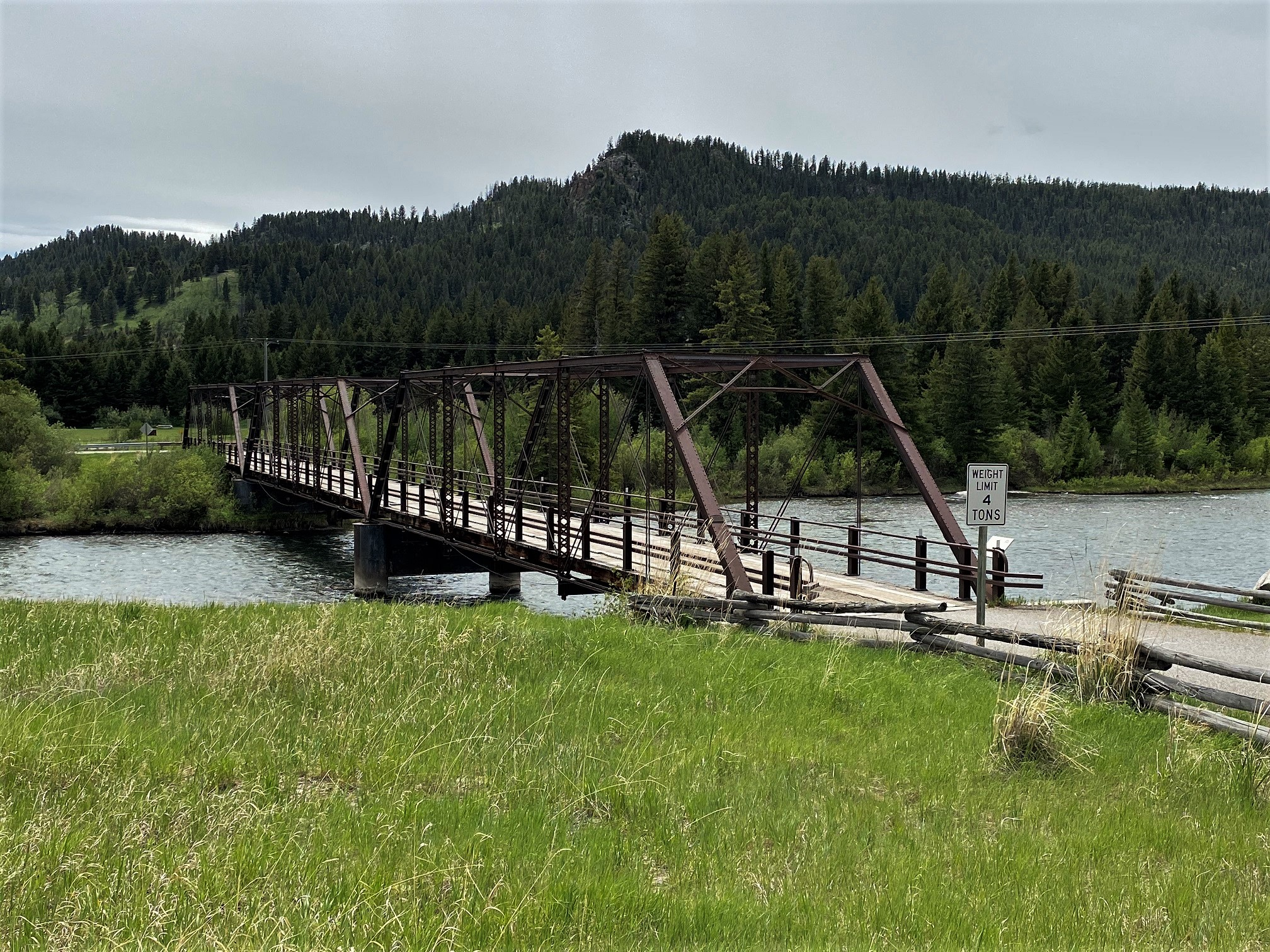

- Location within Montana Location within the United States
- Nearest city: Cameron, Montana
- Coordinates: 44.888738°N 111.580618°W
- Area: less than one acre
- Built: 1902
- Built by: John W. Towle
- Architectural style: Pratt Through Truss
- NRHP reference No.: 99000344
- Added to NRHP: March 18, 1999

The Hutchins Bridge, spanning the Madison River in Madison County, Montana near Cameron, Montana, was listed on the National Register of Historic Places in 1999.

It is a pin-connected three-span Pratt through truss bridge which was built in 1902 by John W. Towle, an engineer from Omaha, Nebraska. Its three trusses are identical, each 100 feet (30 m) long with a 16 feet (4.9 m) roadway.

Wooden 4 by 4 inches (10 cm × 10 cm) posts of its original guardrails survive, but its 2x4 rails are gone, replaced by a chainlink fence protecting pedestrians.

In 1998 the bridge was open but signage limited it to four tons carrying capacity.

It spans the Madison River near the mouth of the West Fork of the Madison River, providing access from what is now U.S. Highway 287 to the West Fork Road. It is about 9 miles (14 km) miles west (downstream) of Quake Lake and 23 miles (37 km) south of Cameron, Montana. The bridge provided access to Yellowstone National Park, allowing travellers to cross where a ford had been and then continuing south, up the west branch of the Madison River. Gilman Sawtell had built a first bridge here in the 1870s; a multi-span wood toll bridge operated from 1885 to 1901. The 1902 bridge served early motorists using the Vigilante Trail highway or the Grand Canyon to Banff highway.

For travelling to Yellowstone, the bridge was bypassed in 1922. In 2019 it serves some campground areas on the west side of the Madison River.
