= Yellowstone River Bridge =

Historic place in Montana, United States

- U.S. National Register of Historic Places
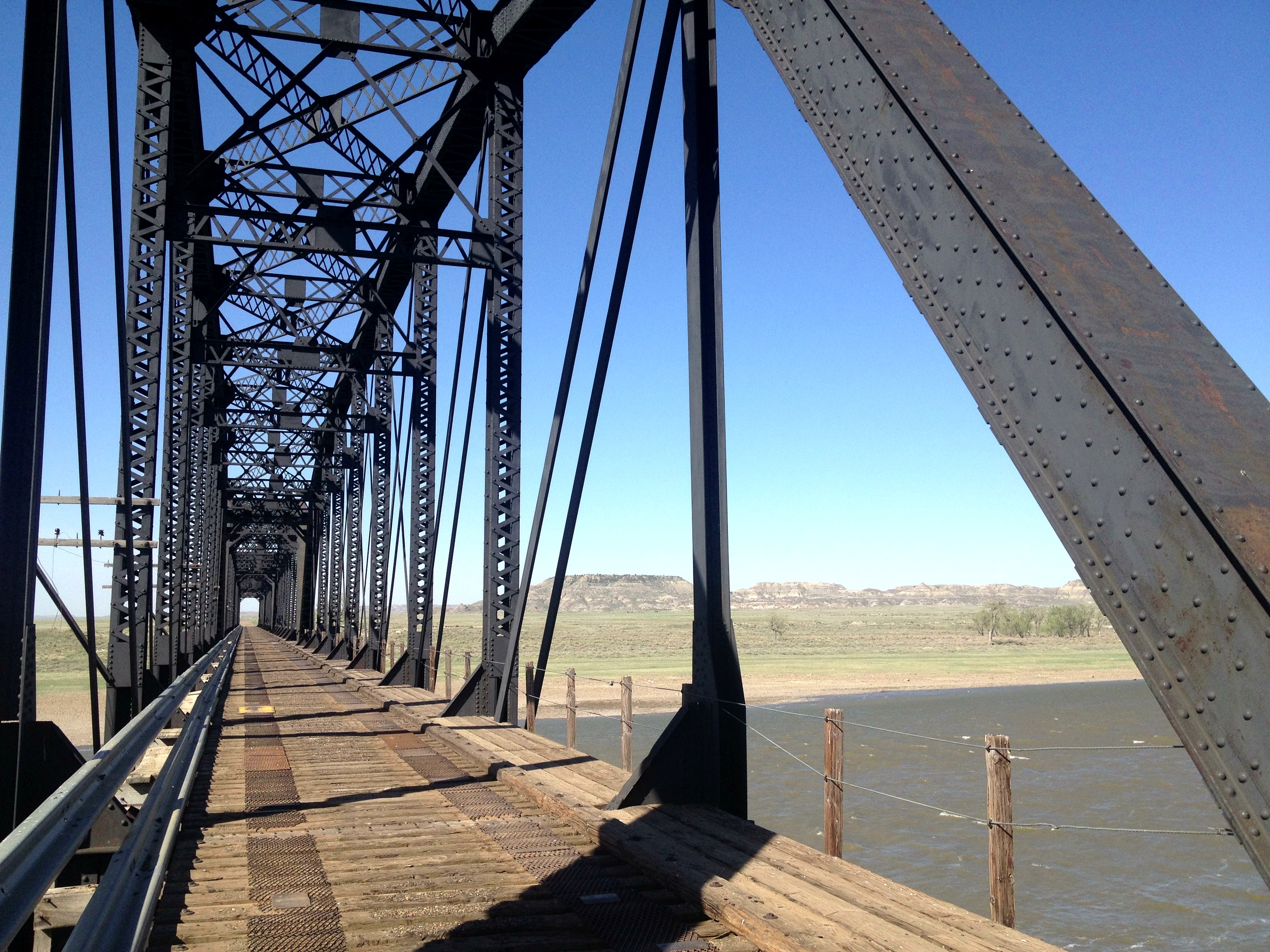

- Location within Montana Location within the United States
- Location: Milepost 1 on Interstate 94, Fallon, Montana
- Coordinates: 46°51′20″N 105°06′59″W
- NRHP reference No.: 09001187
- Added to NRHP: January 4, 2010

The Yellowstone River Bridge is a site on the National Register of Historic Places located in Fallon, Montana, United States. It was added to the Register on January 4, 2010. It is a 2-span, riveted, continuous steel Warren truss bridge. Built between 1943 and 1944, it was one of very few major bridge projects undertaken by the Montana Highway Department during World War II.

The placard reads:

The Yellowstone River Bridge is the longest truss bridge built in Montana at 1,142 feet. It is also one of the few bridges built in Montana during World War II. During the 1930s, the Montana Highway Department welcomed an influx of New Deal money by embarking on ambitious road improvements, including building more than 1,000 bridges. After the attack on Pearl Harbor, however, bridge building screeched to a halt, except on roads designated as critical to national security. These included U.S. Route 10, which connected Seattle to Minneapolis. Thus, in 1943, when an ice jam destroyed the bridge at Fallon, forcing motorists and critical war materials to make a 55-mile detour, the Secretary of Defense ordered the highway department to build a replacement. Specifically designed for wide river crossings, the steel and concrete bridge is a continuous span Warren through truss structure. The trusses are arranged in a "W" configuration that identifies them as Warren trusses. The highway department used this style of bridge from 1933 to 1946. Despite authorization from the War Production Board, labor and steel shortages slowed construction, as did high water and inclement weather. The W. P. Roscoe Company of Billings hired men from the Crow Reservation to help pour the concrete piers and subcontracted with another company to erect the steel trusses. To spectators' amazement, crews worked high in the air, sauntering across I beams seventy feet above ground "as nonchalantly as if traveling on a broad highway." The bridge opened to much fanfare in late November 1944.
