= Hagen Site =

- U.S. National Register of Historic Places
- U.S. National Historic Landmark
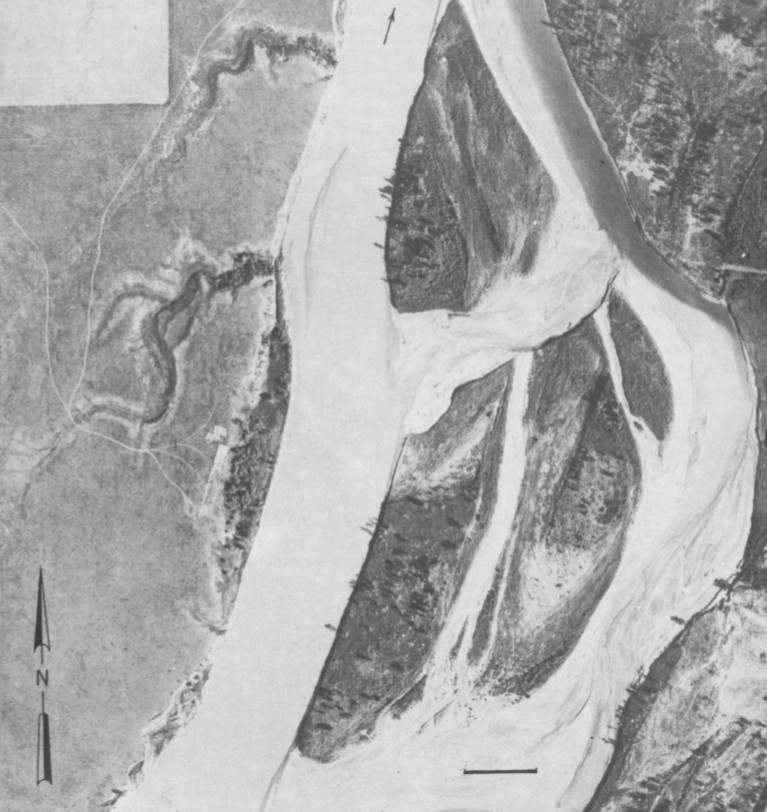
- 1938 aerial photo of the site
- Location: Address restricted
- Nearest city: Glendive, Montana
- Built: 1550
- NRHP reference No.: 66000432

Significant dates
- Added to NRHP: October 15, 1966
- Designated NHL: July 19, 1964

The Hagen Site, also designated by the Smithsonian trinomial 24DW1, is an archaeological site near Glendive in Dawson County, Montana. The site, excavated in the 1930s, is theorized to represent a rare instance of a settlement from early in the period in which the Crow and Hidatsa Native American tribes separated from one another. It was declared a National Historic Landmark in 1964.

== Site description ==
The Hagen Site is located on a terrace on the north bank of the Yellowstone River north of Glendive. It is bounded on the east and north by a generally dry arroyo. The site's human-built features include a pit that has been interpreted as an earth lodge site, cache pits, and hearths. During excavation of a portion of the site in the 1930s, more than 20,000 artifacts were recovered from the site, including large numbers of ceramic fragments, stone tools, animal bones, and fragmentary human remains.

The site was discovered in 1936 by Oscar Lewis, an area resident and amateur archaeologist, and is named for the landowner. It was examined that year by a team funded by the federal National Youth Administration program. It underwent more substantive excavations in the following two years, by teams organized by the state and funded by the Works Progress Administration. These excavations recorded the locations of artifacts in a horizontal but not vertical orientation, a deficiency that has caused later difficulties in using the collection for analysis and comparison.

Finds at the site give some indication of a sedentary horticultural use, consistent with Hidatsa practice, but the site is not anywhere near other known Hidatsa sites, which are primarily on the Missouri River watershed further east in North Dakota. The ceramics at the site bear some resemblance to Crow artifacts, but there is ongoing debate about exactly what constitutes Crow pottery, and the lack of stratigraphic information from the Hagen collection complicates resolution of the question. Despite this problem, the site has been recognized as of unquestioned importance in the region since early analyses were published.

== See also ==
- List of National Historic Landmarks in Montana
- National Register of Historic Places listings in Dawson County, Montana
