= Gladstone Hotel (Circle, Montana) =

- U.S. National Register of Historic Places
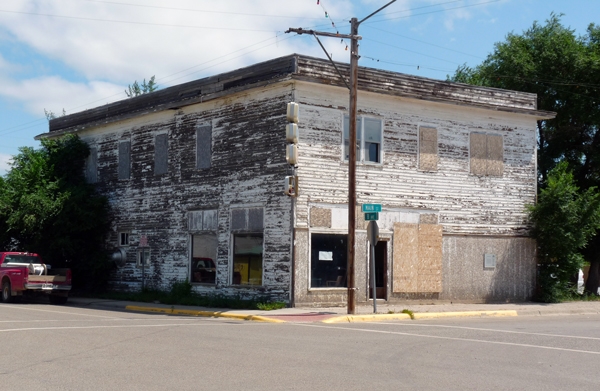
- The now vacant Gladstone Hotel, viewed from northwest on July 16, 2013.

- Location within Montana
- Location: 120 Main Street, Circle, Montana
- Coordinates: 47°25′02.3″N 105°35′14.9″W
- Built: 1915
- NRHP reference No.: 80004592
- Added to NRHP: August 28, 1980

The Gladstone Hotel was a two-story, wood-framed hotel located at 101 Main Street in Circle, Montana, United States. The hotel was built in 1915 and inaugurated at a Christmas party on December 25 of the same year. The town of Circle had been platted the previous year after the Great Northern Railway planned its route through the area; while the hotel was supposed to provide lodging for the visitors and new settlers brought to Circle by the railroad, the railroad was not completed through Circle until 1929. Nevertheless, the hotel served as temporary lodging for new settlers in McCone County and functioned as a community meeting place, including a local bar that lasted until Prohibition. An addition was placed on the hotel in 1948 to accommodate new residents during a local oil boom.

The building was added to the National Register of Historic Places on August 28, 1980. It was destroyed in a fire on September 21, 2023.
