= Big Heaven =

Mountain in the state of Montana

Coordinates: 47°33′12″N 105°58′05″W

Big Heaven is a summit in McCone County, Montana, in the United States. With an elevation of 2,579 feet (786 m), Big Heaven is the 3215th highest summit in the state of Montana.
