= Monroe Avenue Water Filtration Plant =

- U.S. National Register of Historic Places
- Michigan State Historic Site
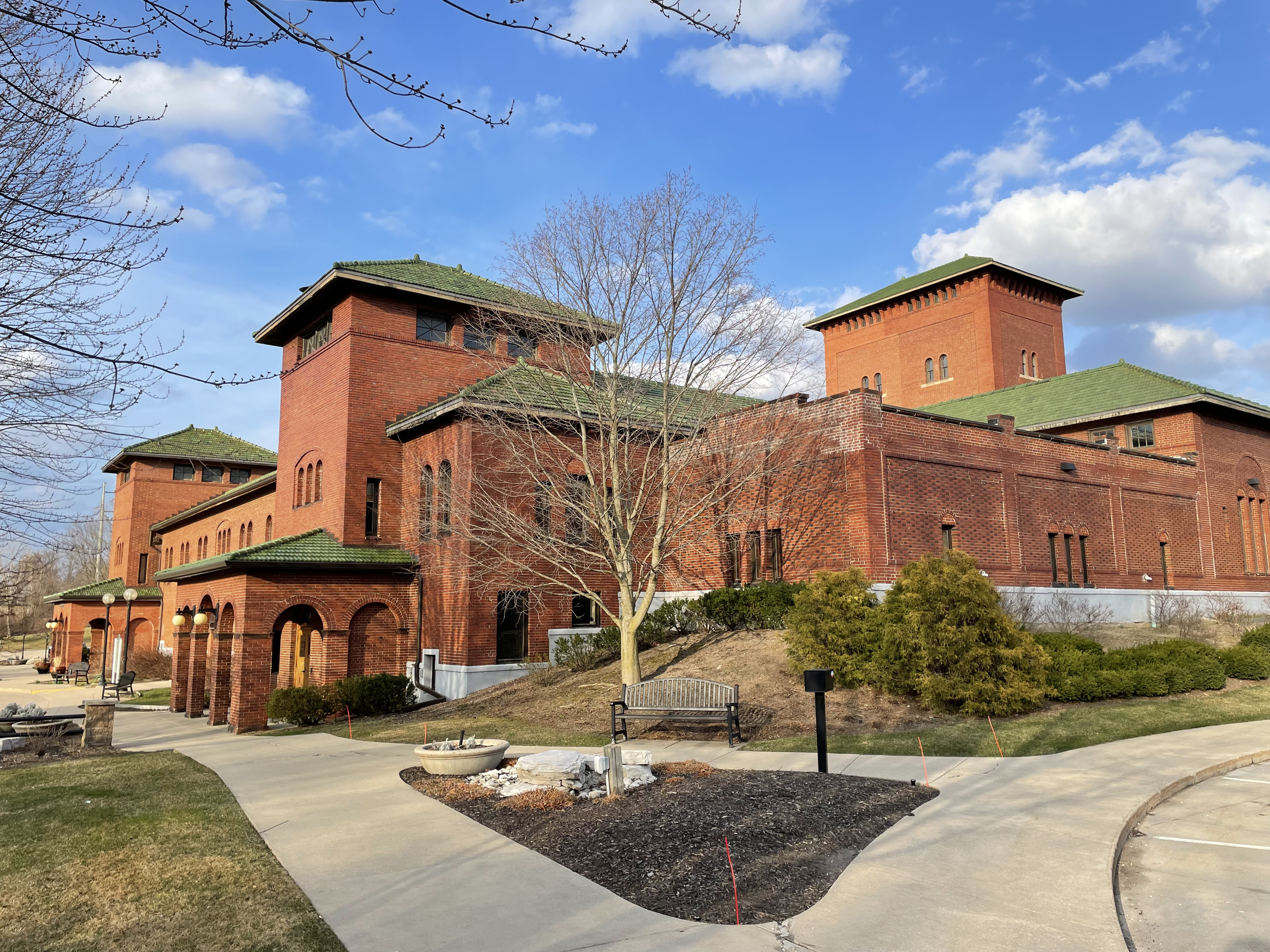
- Interactive map
- Location: 1430 Monroe Ave. NW, Grand Rapids, Michigan
- Coordinates: 42°59′14″N 85°40′12″W
- Area: 6 acres (2.4 ha)
- Built: 1910
- Built by: Gentz Brothers
- Architect: Hering & Fuller, R E. Harrison
- Architectural style: Romanesque Revival
- NRHP reference No.: 02000815
- Added to NRHP: July 31, 2002

The Monroe Avenue Water Filtration Plant is a municipal water treatment plant located at 430 Monroe Avenue NW in Grand Rapids, Michigan. Built in 1910, it was likely the first water filtration plant in Michigan. In 1945, the plant was the site of the first public introduction of water fluoridation in the United States. It was listed on the National Register of Historic Places in 2002. The building now serves as an event center, known as Clearwater Place.

== History ==
By the 1870s, the city of Grand Rapids realized the need for a city-wide water system. Bonds were issued in 1874, and a reservoir constructed. However, by the 1900s, there was increasing pressure to find a new source of clean water for the city. In 1910 bonds were issued to construct a filtration plant to clean water from the Grand River. The city hired nationally known New York City engineers Rudolph Hering and George Warren Fuller of Hering and Fuller Engineers to design the new plant, and construction began in 1910. Gentz Brothers of Grand Rapids was the general contractor. The plant was first put on line in 1912, and was an immediate success, substantially reducing water-borne diseases in the city. By the 1920s, however, the plant already needed to be expanded. A large addition, designed by R E. Harrison, was constructed in 1922-24. Additional expansion was done in 1935.

In 1944, the Grand Rapids City Commission authorized fluoridation of the city's water supply, the first city in the United States to do so. Actual application to the water began in early 1945. In 1961, Grand Rapids constructed a large regional filtration plant using water from Lake Michigan, relegating the Monroe Avenue plant to use as a backup facility. In 1988, the plant was designated as a Michigan Historic Civil Engineering Landmark by the American Society of Civil Engineers. The plant was closed in 1992. In 2005, DeVries Development began renovating the building into a mixed use space, including offices and apartments, named "Clearwater Place." Renovation was completed in 2008. In 2017, the building was renovated into an events center.

== Description ==
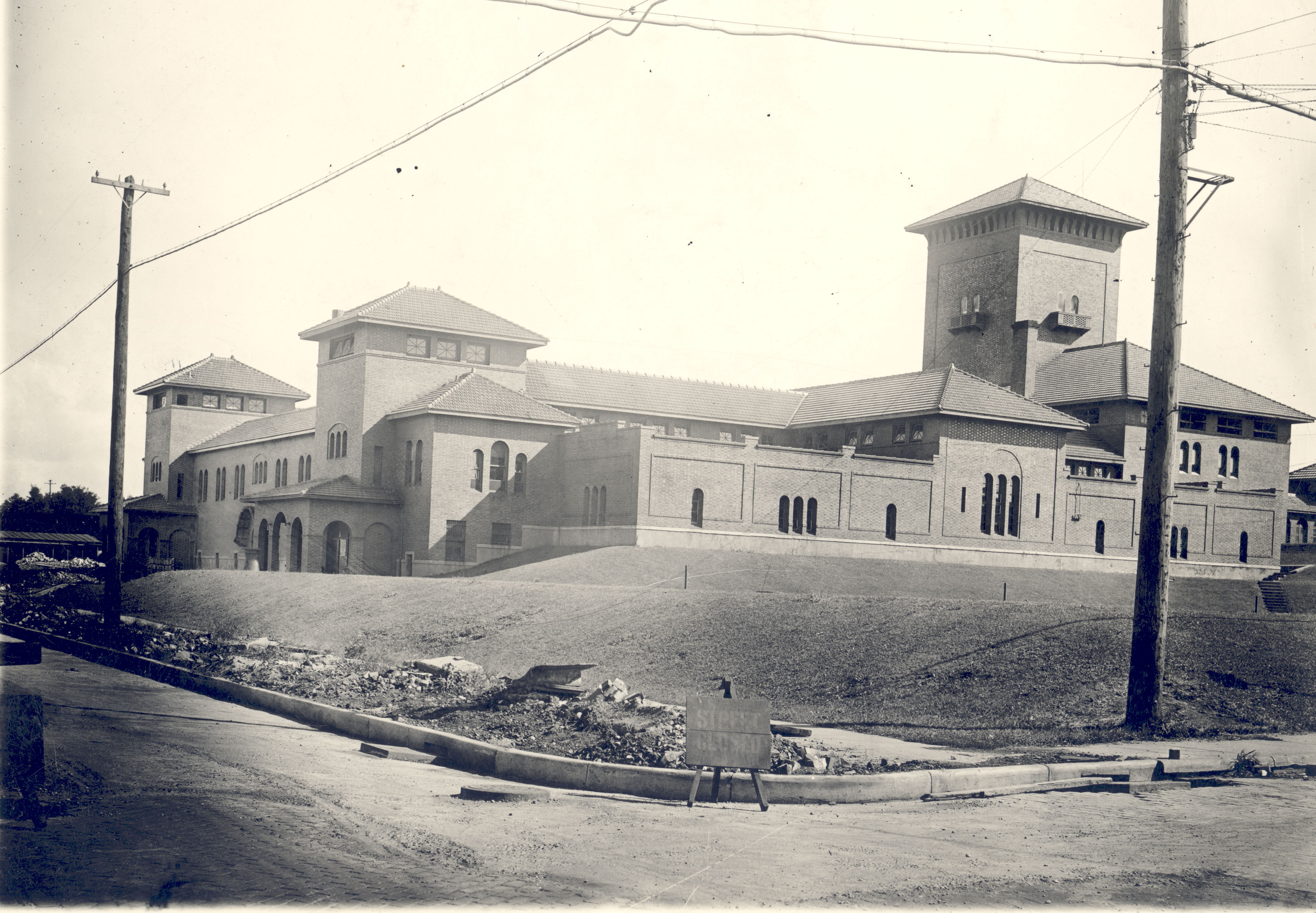
The plant in 1930

The Monroe Avenue Water Filtration Plant consists of two buildings (only one of which, the main building, is historically significant) and two wash tanks. The main building is a simple two-story, red brick Romanesque Revival structure sitting on a concrete base. It has a hipped roof covered in green tile, some of which has been replaced with asphalt shingles. Square towers are sited on the corners of the front facade. These towers contain side entrances under triple sets of arches. Prominently visible is a large, hip roofed central tower, located at the rear, known as the "head house." The two wash tanks are large brick structures located to wither side of the main building. They have conical, low-pitched roofs clad in green tile, and a single row of small rectangular windows.

== See also ==
- Glendive City Water Filtration Plant, NRHP-listed in Glendive, Montana
