= Zero, Montana =

- Unincorporated community
- Location within Montana Location within the United States
- Coordinates: 46°40′9″N 105°29′19″W
- Country: United States
- State: Montana
- County: Prairie
- Elevation: 2,261 ft (689 m)
- Time zone: UTC-7 (Mountain (MST))
  - Summer (DST): UTC-6 (MDT)
- GNIS feature ID: 778759

Zero is an unincorporated community in Prairie County, Montana, United States. Its post office closed in early July 1988.
