= Powder River Bridge =

- U.S. National Register of Historic Places
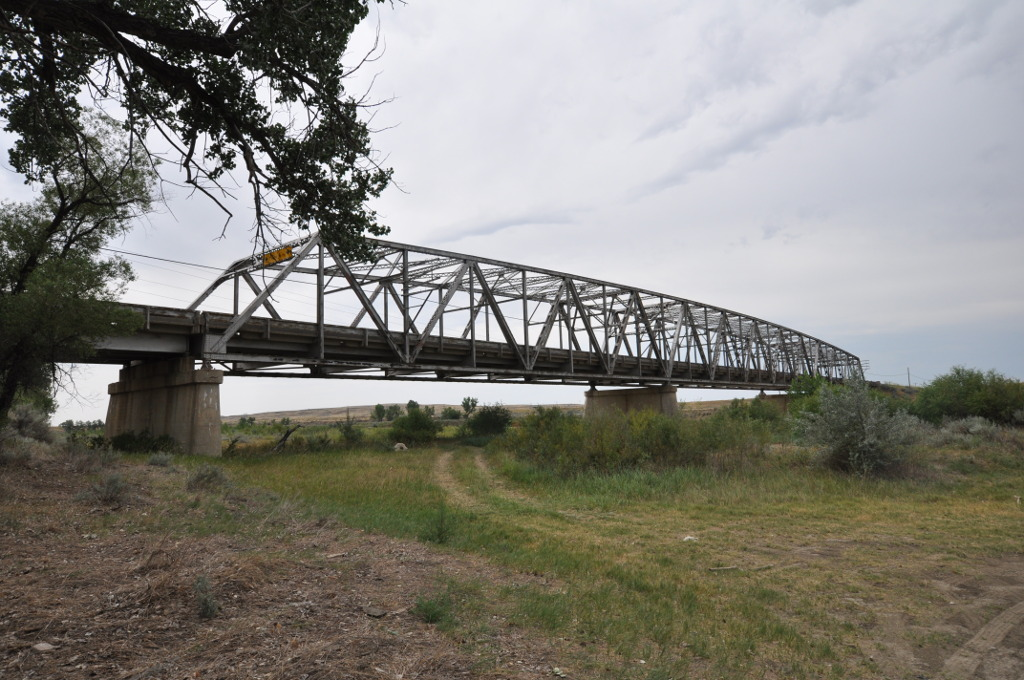

- Location within Montana Location within the United States
- Location: Old US 10, southwest of Terry, Montana
- Coordinates: 46°44′14″N 105°25′43″W
- NRHP reference No.: 09001186
- Added to NRHP: January 4, 2010

The Powder River Bridge is a bridge spanning the Powder River just above its confluence with the Yellowstone River in Prairie County, Montana. It was added to the National Register of Historic Places on January 4, 2010. It is a steel truss style bridge built in 1946. The bridge is 633 feet in length consisting of a 203-foot main truss span and two 163-foot truss spans.
