= Prairie Elk Colony, Montana =

- Census-designated place
- Location within Montana Location within the United States
- Coordinates: 48°00′53″N 105°47′53″W
- Country: United States
- State: Montana
- County: McCone

Area
  - Total: 0.35 sq mi (0.90 km^{2})
  - Land: 0.35 sq mi (0.90 km^{2})
  - Water: 0 sq mi (0.00 km^{2})
- Elevation: 2,041 ft (622 m)

Population (2020)
  - Total: 0
  - Density: 0/sq mi (0/km^{2})
- Time zone: UTC-7 (Mountain (MST))
  - Summer (DST): UTC-6 (MDT)
- ZIP Code: 59201 (Wolf Point)
- Area code: 406
- FIPS code: 30-59650
- GNIS feature ID: 2806640

Prairie Elk Colony is a Hutterite community and census-designated place (CDP) in McCone County, Montana, United States. It is on the northern edge of the county, just south of the Missouri River, which forms the county line. By road it is 20 miles (32 km) southwest of Wolf Point, the nearest town.

The community was first listed as a CDP for the 2020 census, at which time the population was recorded as 0.

Historical population
Census	Pop.	Note	%±
2020	0		—
U.S. Decennial Census
