= Mildred, Montana =

- Unincorporated community
- Location within Montana Location within the United States
- Coordinates: 46°40′33″N 104°57′36″W
- Country: United States
- State: Montana
- County: Prairie
- Established: 1908
- Elevation: 2,359 ft (719 m)
- Time zone: UTC-7 (Mountain (MST))
  - Summer (DST): UTC-6 (MDT)
- ZIP code: 59341
- Area code: 406
- GNIS feature ID: 774199

Mildred is an unincorporated community in Prairie County, Montana, United States. Mildred is located along a former Chicago, Milwaukee, St. Paul and Pacific Railroad line 18.5 miles (29.8 km) east-southeast of Terry. It was platted in 1908 and the first post office was established with Edward Harper as postmaster. The town was named for the daughter of a Milwaulkee Railroad official.

Mildred was on the Yellowstone Trail and lost population once the highway was built.

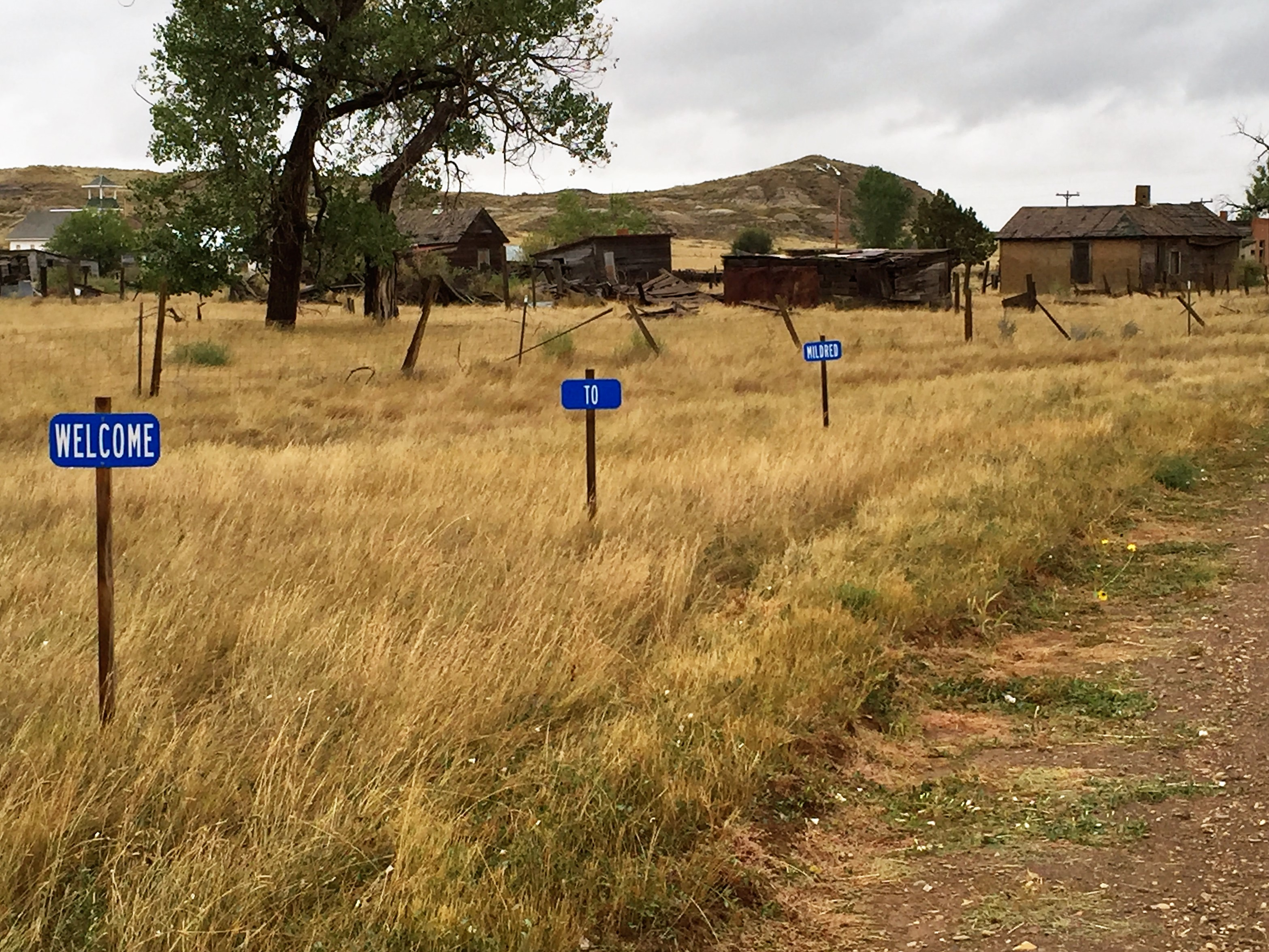
Welcome to Mildred (Montana)

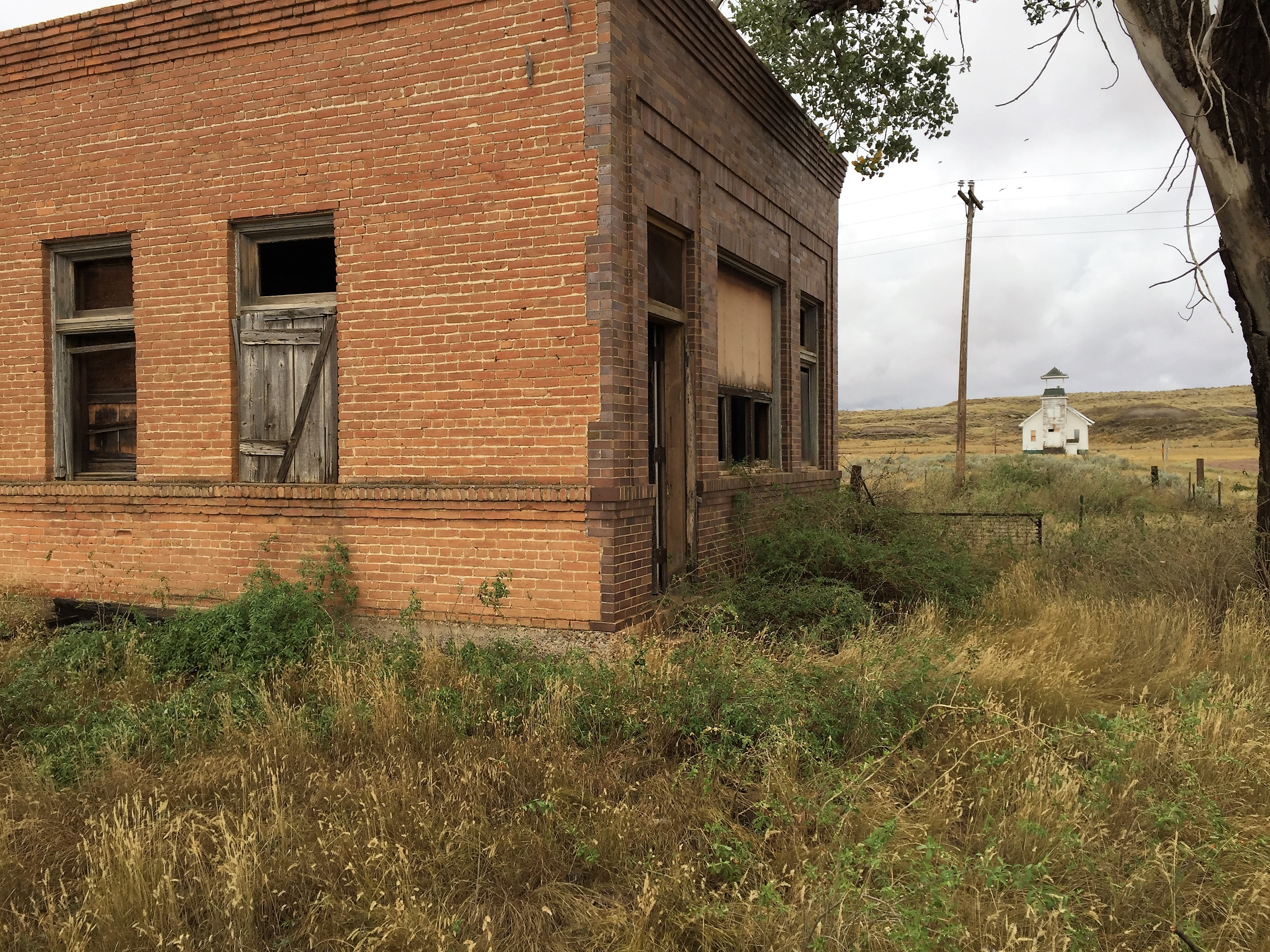
Abandoned bank and church in Mildred, MT

== Climate ==
According to the Köppen Climate Classification system, Mildred has a cold semi-arid climate, abbreviated "BSk" on climate maps. The hottest temperature recorded in Mildred was 113 °F (45.0 °C) on July 20, 1960 and July 13, 2026, while the coldest temperature recorded was −50 °F (−45.6 °C) on February 16, 1936.

Climate data for Mildred, Montana, 1991–2020 normals, extremes 1918–present (Note: MILDRED 1918–1978, MILDRED 7 NNW 1979–PRESENT)
Month	Jan	Feb	Mar	Apr	May	Jun	Jul	Aug	Sep	Oct	Nov	Dec	Year
Record high °F (°C)	64 (18)	73 (23)	83 (28)	94 (34)	103 (39)	109 (43)	113 (45)	112 (44)	105 (41)	95 (35)	78 (26)	70 (21)	113 (45)
Mean maximum °F (°C)	50.9 (10.5)	55.0 (12.8)	70.2 (21.2)	80.7 (27.1)	87.0 (30.6)	94.4 (34.7)	101.1 (38.4)	100.4 (38.0)	95.9 (35.5)	83.5 (28.6)	66.8 (19.3)	52.6 (11.4)	102.9 (39.4)
Mean daily maximum °F (°C)	28.6 (−1.9)	33.2 (0.7)	45.5 (7.5)	57.3 (14.1)	67.3 (19.6)	77.5 (25.3)	87.2 (30.7)	86.6 (30.3)	75.6 (24.2)	59.1 (15.1)	43.8 (6.6)	32.2 (0.1)	57.8 (14.4)
Daily mean °F (°C)	17.1 (−8.3)	21.2 (−6.0)	32.3 (0.2)	43.3 (6.3)	53.3 (11.8)	63.6 (17.6)	71.4 (21.9)	69.9 (21.1)	59.3 (15.2)	45.1 (7.3)	31.6 (−0.2)	20.9 (−6.2)	44.1 (6.7)
Mean daily minimum °F (°C)	5.6 (−14.7)	9.3 (−12.6)	19.1 (−7.2)	29.3 (−1.5)	39.4 (4.1)	49.7 (9.8)	55.6 (13.1)	53.2 (11.8)	43.0 (6.1)	31.2 (−0.4)	19.4 (−7.0)	9.7 (−12.4)	30.4 (−0.9)
Mean minimum °F (°C)	−22.4 (−30.2)	−13.8 (−25.4)	−5.3 (−20.7)	12.7 (−10.7)	25.6 (−3.6)	37.1 (2.8)	44.1 (6.7)	39.3 (4.1)	28.9 (−1.7)	14.3 (−9.8)	−3.6 (−19.8)	−16.8 (−27.1)	−27.7 (−33.2)
Record low °F (°C)	−43 (−42)	−50 (−46)	−35 (−37)	−8 (−22)	11 (−12)	26 (−3)	32 (0)	27 (−3)	9 (−13)	−11 (−24)	−29 (−34)	−46 (−43)	−50 (−46)
Average precipitation inches (mm)	0.29 (7.4)	0.33 (8.4)	0.57 (14)	1.54 (39)	2.83 (72)	2.30 (58)	2.03 (52)	1.26 (32)	1.35 (34)	1.15 (29)	0.37 (9.4)	0.30 (7.6)	14.32 (362.8)
Average precipitation days (≥ 0.01 in)	3.8	3.4	4.4	5.9	8.8	7.7	6.7	4.5	4.6	4.6	3.0	3.3	60.7
Source 1: NOAA
Source 2: National Weather Service
