= Bad Route Creek Bridge =

- U.S. National Register of Historic Places
- Location within Montana Location within the United States
- Location: Milepost 20 on County Road 261, near Fallon in Dawson County, Montana
- Coordinates: 46°53′23″N 105°0′36″W
- MPS: Reinforced Concrete Bridges in Montana, 1900-1958 MPS
- NRHP reference No.: 11000224
- Added to NRHP: April 28, 2011

Bad Route Creek Bridge is a historic bridge which carries County Road 261 across the Bad Route Creek in Dawson County, Montana. The Security Bridge Company built the bridge on behalf of the Montana Highway Department in 1921–22. The reinforced concrete bridge has six spans and is 98 feet (30 m) long, making it the longest concrete bridge built by the highway department. Neither the bridge company nor the highway department used concrete extensively, and most concrete bridges in the state only had one or two spans; as a result, the bridge is an unusual and well-preserved example of its type. The bridge was part of a route linking Glendive to Terry, which became part of U.S. Route 10 in 1926. US 10 bypassed the bridge when it was rebuilt in 1950.

The bridge was listed on the National Register of Historic Places on April 28, 2011.
