= Big Horn River Bridge =

- U.S. National Register of Historic Places
- Location within Montana Location within the United States
- Location: Milepost 2 on Montana Highway 104, Custer, Montana
- Coordinates: 46°08′50″N 107°28′03″W
- NRHP reference No.: 09001188
- Added to NRHP: January 4, 2010

The Big Horn River Bridge is a site on the National Register of Historic Places located in Custer, Montana. It was added to the Register on January 4, 2010. The bridge is a riveted Pennsylvania through truss structure that was constructed over a two-year period between 1931 and 1933. It is 624 feet in length and 21 feet wide. The bridge is located in a floodplain near the mouth of the river, which has historically been prone to flooding. Flooding has been reduced since the building upstream of Yellowtail Dam, completed in 1967, but high waters have occurred since, including notably 1978 and 2011. The classic Western novel The Virginian, published by Owen Wister in 1902, mentions a washout of the Northern Pacific railroad bridge over the Big Horn River near here:

"This filling and repairing looks like the washout might have been true."
"Washout? said Scipio.
"Big Horn bridge, they say--four days ago."

(chapter 16, p.204)
