= Roosevelt Toston =

Roosevelt Toston is an author and former Las Vegas news reporter and anchor (1970–1975). Toston worked for the local NBC affiliate, KORK TV, Channel 3 (now KVBC) from 1970–1972 and the local CBS affiliate, KLAS Channel 8 from 1972-1975. Toston was the city's first African-American news anchor. After his career in broadcasting, Toston served as a marketing executive for The Las Vegas Convention and Visitors Authority from 1975-2004. Toston's autobiography, Beating the Odds, illustrates his life from his childhood in Epps, Louisiana to the present.
