= Saugus, Montana =

Unincorporated community in Montana, U.S.

Coordinates: 46°41′30″N 105°29′32″W

Saugus is a rural unincorporated community in Prairie County, Montana, United States, along the Yellowstone River. It was the location of the Custer Creek train wreck.

Saugus was once one of the biggest cattle and horse shipping points in eastern Montana. In 1909, then in Custer County, Saugus opened its post office. Saugus was also home to a school. In 1925, the post office was discontinued. The community is now served by the Terry post office (Zip Code 59349).

The town was on the Milwaukee Road railroad line. On June 19, 1938, the Olympian #15, a Trans-Missouri passenger train, derailed when bridge piers were undermined by the high water of Custer Creek caused by a cloudburst. Seven of the 11 cars derailed. Of the 175 people aboard, 47 people drowned and 75 were injured. Some bodies were never recovered. The Milwaukee Road changed the named of the station to Susan to honor cattlewoman Susan Haughian (who, along with her sons, owned the land the station was located on) and to remove its association with the accident.

The last railroad to run through Saugus was the Burlington Northern Railroad.
