= Blackstock Residence =

Historic house in Montana, United States

- U.S. National Register of Historic Places
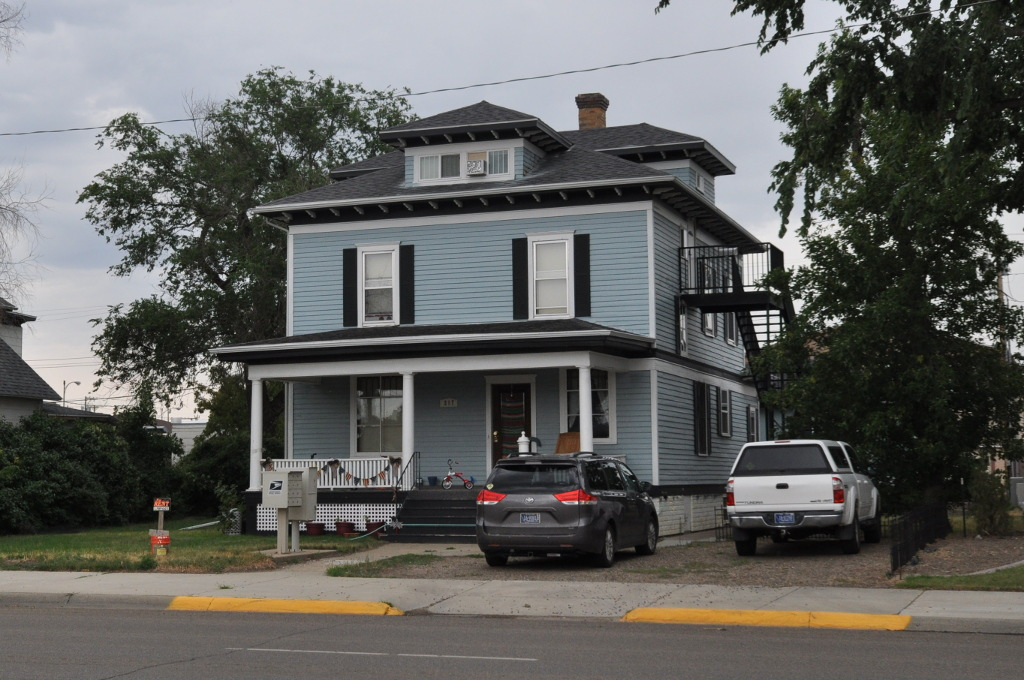

- Location within Montana Location within the United States
- Location: 217 W. Towne, Glendive, Montana
- Coordinates: 47°6′21″N 104°42′51″W
- Area: less than one acre
- Built: 1905-1910
- MPS: Glendive MRA
- NRHP reference No.: 87002515
- Added to NRHP: February 3, 1988

The Blackstock Residence at 217 W. Towne in Glendive, Montana is a historic house that was built sometime between 1905 and 1910. It was listed on the National Register of Historic Places in 1988.

A review in 1987 asserted "It is an excellent example of a pattern book box style house with hip roof, hip roof dormers, clapboard siding with end boards, and architectural detail such as large extending eaves with raking cornice, decorative brackets under the eaves, wood shingle dormer siding. Only minor alterations, such as removal of porch roof railing detracts from integrity of structure."

It was listed on the National Register as part of a study of multiple historic resources in Glendive which also listed several others.
