= Glendive City Water Filtration Plant =

- U.S. National Register of Historic Places
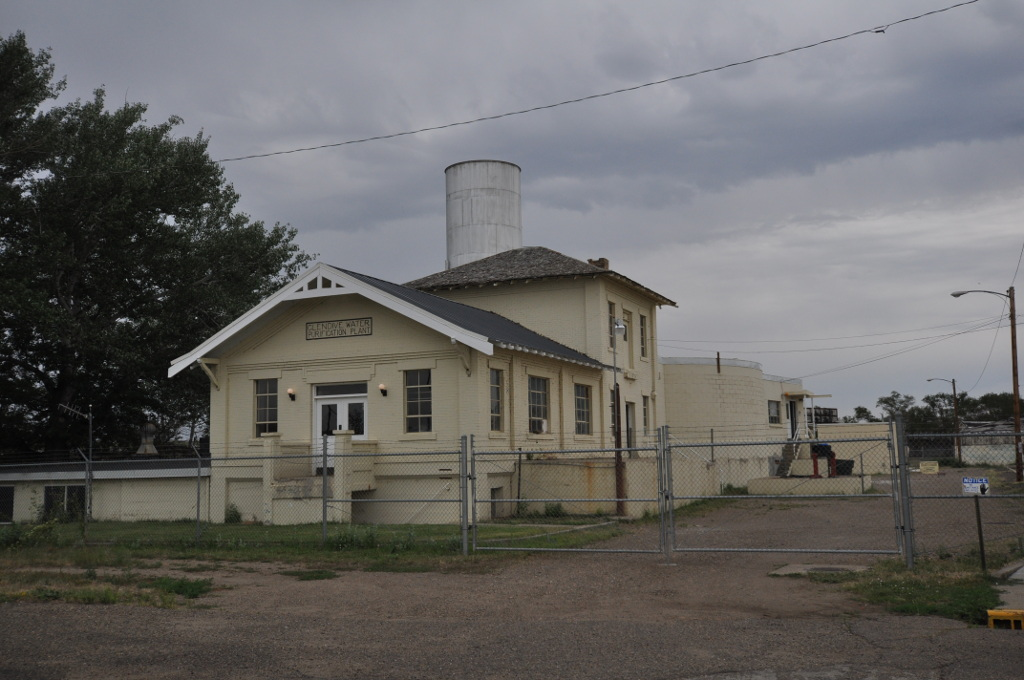

- Location within Montana Location within the United States
- Location: 420 W. Bell St., Glendive, Montana
- Coordinates: 47°6′21″N 104°43′2″W
- Area: less than one acre
- Built: 1917
- Built by: Norwood Engineering
- Engineer: Burns & McConnell Engineering
- MPS: Glendive MRA
- NRHP reference No.: 87002512
- Added to NRHP: February 3, 1988

The Glendive City Water Filtration Plant, in Glendive, Montana, was built in 1917 after years of delays, after the city was founded in 1902. Water was delivered in barrels to residences in Glendive until it was completed. It was listed on the National Register of Historic Places in 1988.

Burns & McConnell Engineering designed the brick 30 by 56 feet (9.1 m × 17.1 m) plant and Norwood Engineering of Florence, Massachusetts constructed it. A two-story addition was made in 1923.

It was listed on the National Register as part of a study of multiple historic resources in Glendive, which also listed several others.

== See also ==
- Monroe Avenue Water Filtration Plant, NRHP-listed in Grand Rapids, Michigan
