= Glendive Heat, Light and Power Company Power Plant =

- U.S. National Register of Historic Places
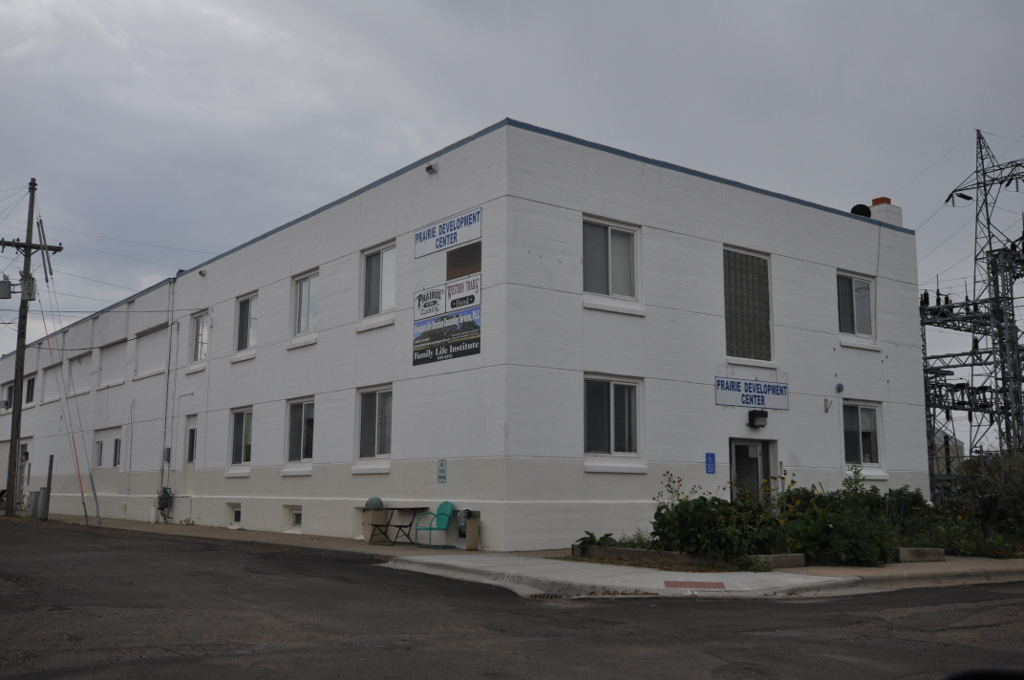

- Location within Montana Location within the United States
- Location: Clough St., Glendive, Montana
- Coordinates: 47°6′18″N 104°43′2″W
- Area: 1 acre (0.40 ha)
- Built: 1914
- Built by: Glendive Heat, Light & Power Co.
- MPS: Glendive MRA
- NRHP reference No.: 87002511
- Added to NRHP: February 3, 1988

The Glendive Heat, Light and Power Company Power Plant on Clough St. in Glendive, Montana was built in 1914. It was listed on the National Register of Historic Places in 1988. The listing included a contributing building and two contributing structures.

The power generating plant was built in 1914 by the Glendive Heat, Light and Power Co. and included two General Electric 500 KW turbo-generators and three coal-fired sterling boilers. These burned lignite coal. The Eastern Montana Light and Power Company took over the plant in 1920. It was bought in 1926 by the Minnesota Northern Power Company, which installed a 2,000-KW Allis-Chalmers generator with a Webster gas burner.

It was listed on the National Register as part of a study of multiple historic resources in Glendive which also listed several others. It is now the Farm to Table store in Glendive, Montana.
