= Locate Creek Bridge =

- U.S. National Register of Historic Places
- Location within Montana Location within the United States
- Location: Mile 3 N. Locate Rd., near Miles City, Montana
- Coordinates: 46°28′30″N 105°18′17″W
- Built: 1901
- NRHP reference No.: 12000170
- Added to NRHP: March 26, 2012

The Locate Creek Bridge, located on N. Locate Rd. near Miles City, Montana, is a historic bridge that is listed on the National Register of Historic Places. It is significant as the oldest steel stringer bridge in the state of Montana.

It was built in 1901 by Custer County. The bridge was part of a Custer County program to build bridges to bring farmers and ranchers into convenient reach of railroads.

The significance of the bridge was recognized by local, state, and national officials of historic registers, culminating in it being listed on the National Register on March 26, 2012. It was listed, along with three others on that day, as part of a Multiple Property Submission, Montana's Steel Stringer and Steel Girder Bridges MPS.

From information available, it seems the bridge is located three miles north along N. Locate Road, which seems to be the road also known as Mizpah Road, north from U.S. 12, east of Miles City.
