= Charles Krug House =

Historic house in Montana, United States

- U.S. National Register of Historic Places
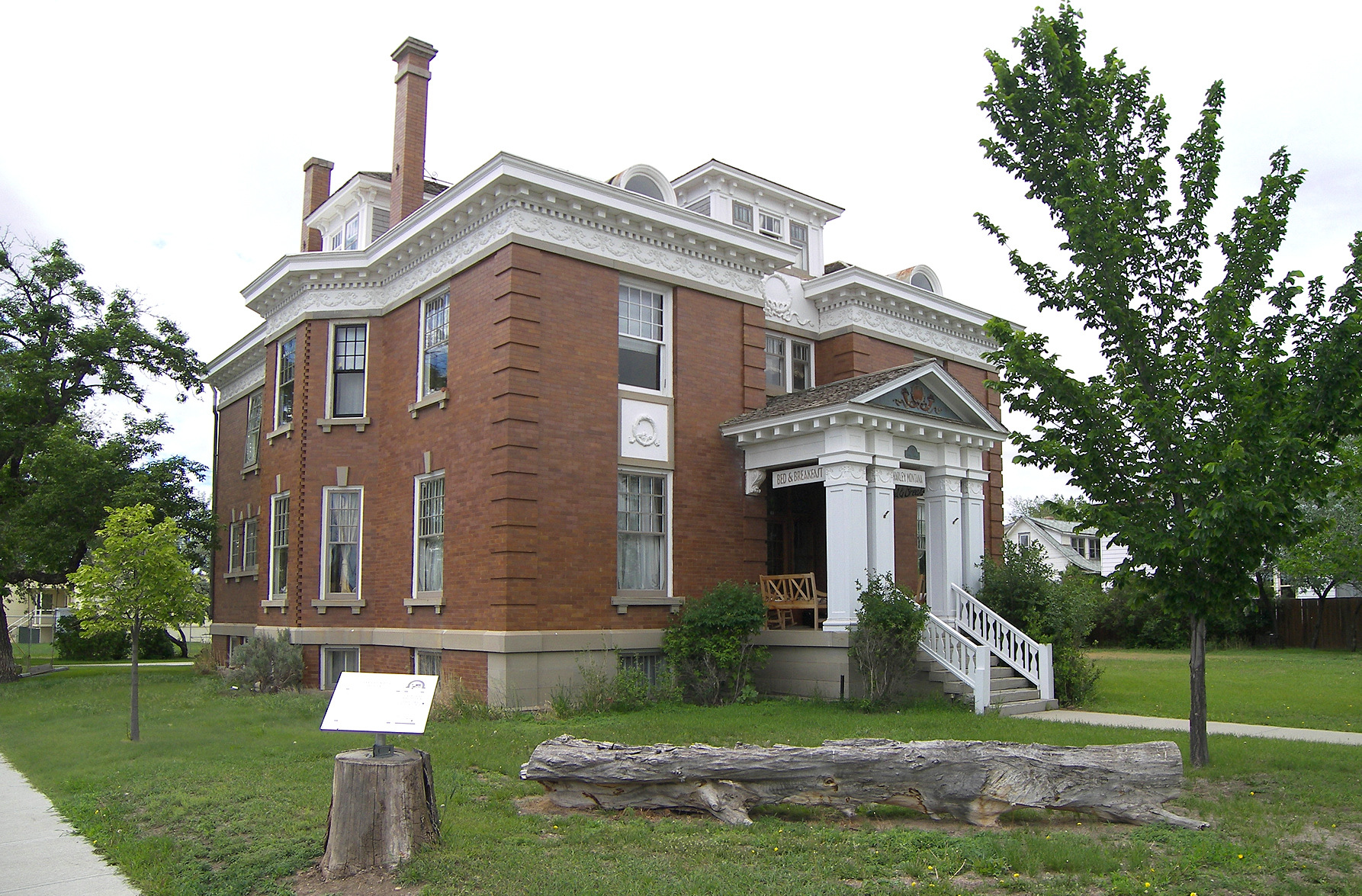
- House in 2008

- Location within Montana Location within the United States
- Location: 103 N. Douglas St., Glendive, Montana
- Coordinates: 47°6′21″N 104°42′59″W
- Area: 0.4 acres (0.16 ha)
- Built: 1907
- Built by: Chivers, Herbert C.
- NRHP reference No.: 76001122
- Added to NRHP: June 3, 1976

The Charles Krug House, also known as the Krug House or the "Krug Mansion", is a former residence at 103 N. Douglas Street, Glendive, Montana, US, designed by St. Louis, Missouri-based architect Herbert C. Chivers (1869-1946). It was listed on the National Register of Historic Places in 1976. The Krug Mansion now houses Sugar Plum Fine Jewelry and is no longer a private residence.

Charles Krug was a successful rancher and president of the Merchants National Bank. In 1900 at age 54, Krug married Annie A Hackney, the mother of two daughters. They had five more children together. The house was built in 1906 to accommodate the large family.

The NRHP nomination states: "The Krug House is a grand expression of a by-gone age, reminding our current generation of the integrity and perseverance of Charles Krug, and of the timeless values of fine construction that are represented in this eastern Montana home."
