= Northern Pacific Railroad Settling Tanks =

- U.S. National Register of Historic Places
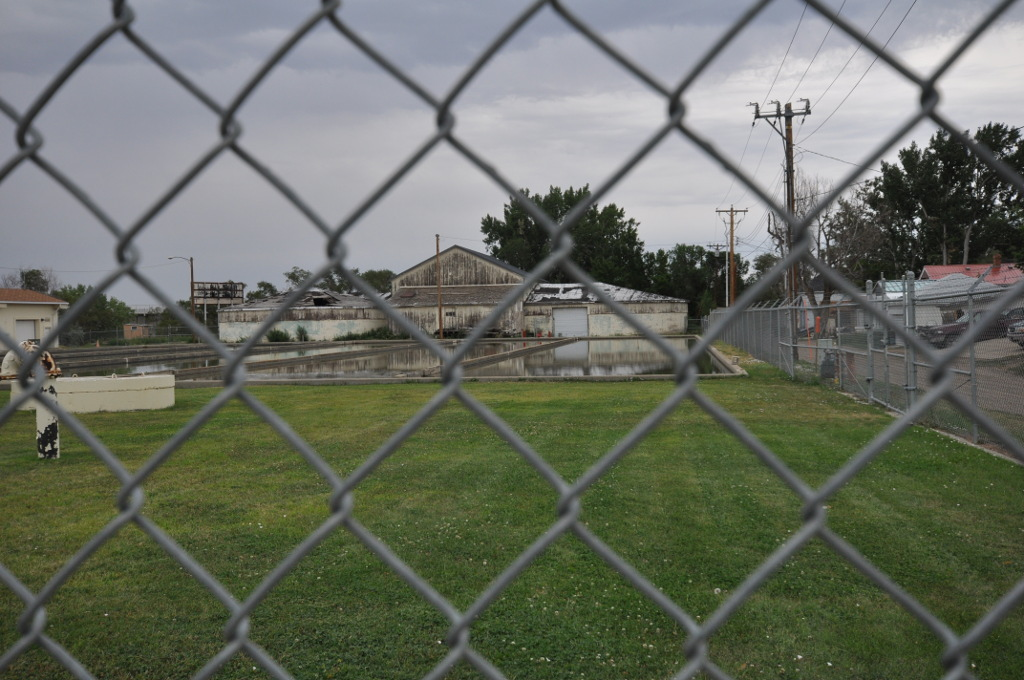
- The settling tanks are the deteriorating structures in the background of this 2017 photo

- Location within Montana Location within the United States
- Location: Towne and Clough Sts., Glendive, Montana
- Coordinates: 47°6′25″N 104°43′2″W
- Area: 1 acre (0.40 ha)
- Built: 1905-1910
- Built by: Northern Pacific Railroad
- MPS: Glendive MRA
- NRHP reference No.: 87002507
- Added to NRHP: February 3, 1988

The Northern Pacific Railroad Settling Tanks in Glendive, Montana were built in 1905 by the Northern Pacific Railroad. The site was listed on the National Register of Historic Places in 1988. The listing included two contributing buildings and two contributing structures. It includes a caretaker's cottage built in about 1910. The site has also been known as Glendive City Shops, as they have been repurposed as city maintenance facilities.

It was listed on the National Register as part of a study of multiple historic resources in Glendive, which also listed several others.
