= Custer Creek train wreck =

Train wreck outside of Saugus, Montana

Coordinates: 46°42′01″N 105°29′10″W

Details
- Date: June 19, 1938; 88 years ago 12.35 a.m.
- Location: Prairie County, near Saugus, Montana
- Country: United States
- Operator: Milwaukee Road
- Incident type: Bridge collapse
- Cause: Cloudburst

Statistics
- Trains: 1
- Passengers: 155
- Deaths: 49
- Injured: 75

The Custer Creek train wreck (sometimes called the Saugus train wreck) is the worst rail disaster in Montana history. It occurred on June 19, 1938 when a bridge, its foundations washed away by a flash flood, collapsed beneath Milwaukee Road's Olympian as it crossed Custer Creek, near Saugus, Montana, south-west of Terry, killing 49 people.

== Bridge AA-438 ==
The bridge, number AA-438, was 180 feet (55 m) long and had been constructed in 1913. It consisted of two 50-foot (15 m) plate girder spans and five reinforced concrete trestle slab spans carrying the single track across the creek resting on concrete piers. An inspection of the bridge earlier that year had concluded the bridge was in good condition with sufficient rip-rap in place to prevent scouring.

== Custer Creek ==
Custer Creek itself normally runs dry for nine months of the year and had never been known to rise to a depth of more than five feet (1.5 m). But on the night in question a cloudburst deposited an estimated 4 to 7 inches (100 to 180 mm) of rain on the area drained by the creek. The previous train had crossed the bridge at 10:15 p.m. at which point the engineer estimated the water to be about three or four feet (0.91 or 1.22 m) deep. Twenty minutes later, in view of the heavy rainfall experienced the section foreman performed an inspection of the track and estimated the depth of water to be six or seven feet (1.8 or 2.1 m) beneath the level of the girders of the bridge (i.e. around six feet (1.8 m) deep), giving no indication of the trouble to come.

== Olympian ==
The westbound Olympian that night was hauled by Class S-2 4-8-4 No.220 and comprised eleven cars. It was traveling from Chicago to Tacoma and carrying 155 passengers when it neared Custer Creek at a speed of 50 mph. There was no water on the track to warn the engineer that beneath was a torrent of water thirty feet (9.1 m) high, battering at the bridge foundations, and no brake application was made.

== Wreck ==
As the Olympian crossed at 12:35 a.m. the bridge collapsed; the engine and seven passenger cars were thrown into the swollen creek. On the west bank the locomotive and five cars were "piled in a shambles of crumpled steel", killing the engineer and fireman. The wreck happened so quickly that when the body of the engineer was recovered he was still sitting in his seat with his hand on the throttle. "Two other cars ended up deep in the roaring creek". Rescue efforts were mounted by the train crew and uninjured passengers; smashing windows on the partly submerged cars to provide escape routes. Although the official death toll stands at 47, this is an estimate as several bodies were swept into the Yellowstone River, one body being recovered at Glendive 50 miles (80 km) downstream. 75 people were injured. Newspapers reported the paradox that modern air-conditioned rolling stock required sealed windows, and that the use of shatterproof glass was partially responsible for some deaths.

== Investigation ==
The investigation determined that the volume and velocity of water flowing beneath the bridge that night was "much in excess of any that had been experienced before or might be anticipated at this place". The bridge structure was still intact when the train reached it but two of the central piers had been undermined. The weight of the locomotive caused the piers to subside and the bridge to collapse.

== In popular culture ==
The train accident in Marilynne Robinson’s novel Housekeeping bears many similarities to the disaster. Edmund Foster, the protagonists’ grandfather, is driven by a desire to escape the constraints of life in the fictional Idaho town of Fingerbone. This longing leads him to take a job on the railroad. While working on the train, he is killed when it crashes into the local lake, an event that serves as the novel’s founding tragedy and shapes the lives of subsequent generations.
