= Bell Street Bridge =

- U.S. National Register of Historic Places
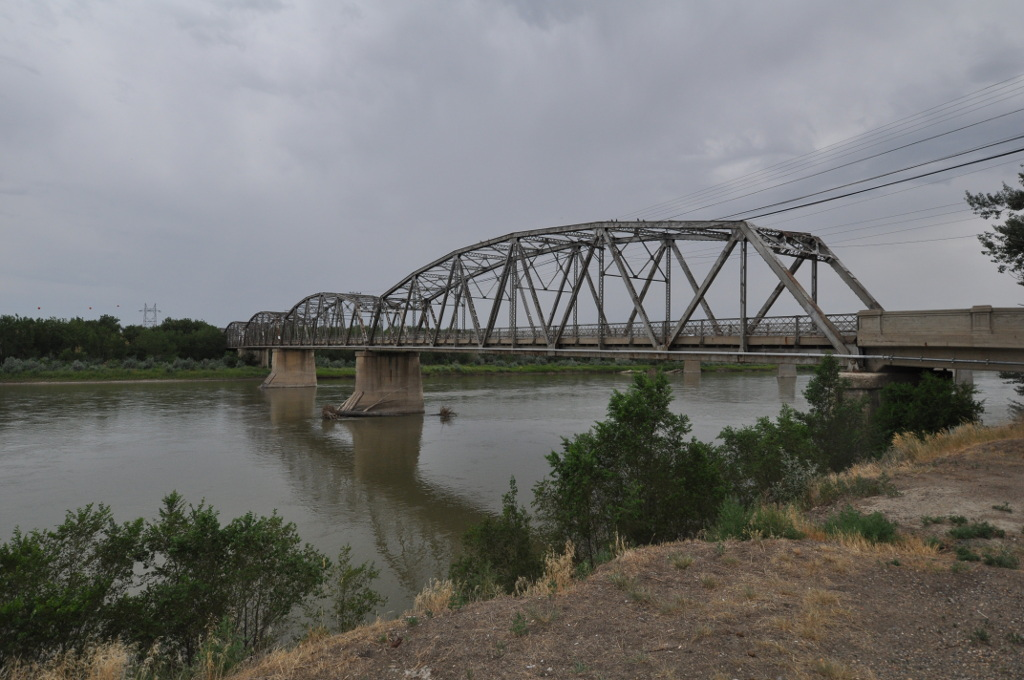

- Location within Montana Location within the United States
- Location: W. Bell St., Glendive, Montana
- Coordinates: 47°6′20″N 104°43′9″W
- Area: less than one acre
- Built: 1926
- Built by: Boomer, McGuire & Blakesley
- Architect: Montana Highway Commission
- Architectural style: Warren through truss
- MPS: Glendive MRA
- NRHP reference No.: 87002517
- Added to NRHP: February 3, 1988

Completed in 1926 at a cost of $305,000, the Bell Street Bridge crosses the Yellowstone River in Glendive, Montana. Designed by the Montana Highway Commission and built by contractor Boomer, McGuire & Blakesley, the 1,352 feet (412 m) long, 20 feet (6.1 m) wide bridge consists of six Warren through truss spans, each roughly 219 feet (67 m) long, and a concrete approach span about 38 feet (12 m) long. It was listed on the National Register of Historic Places in 1988. At one time the main highway bridge over the river, Montana DOT rehabilitated and converted it for pedestrian use in 1992 when the bridge on the I-94 Business Loop was built 300’ to the north.

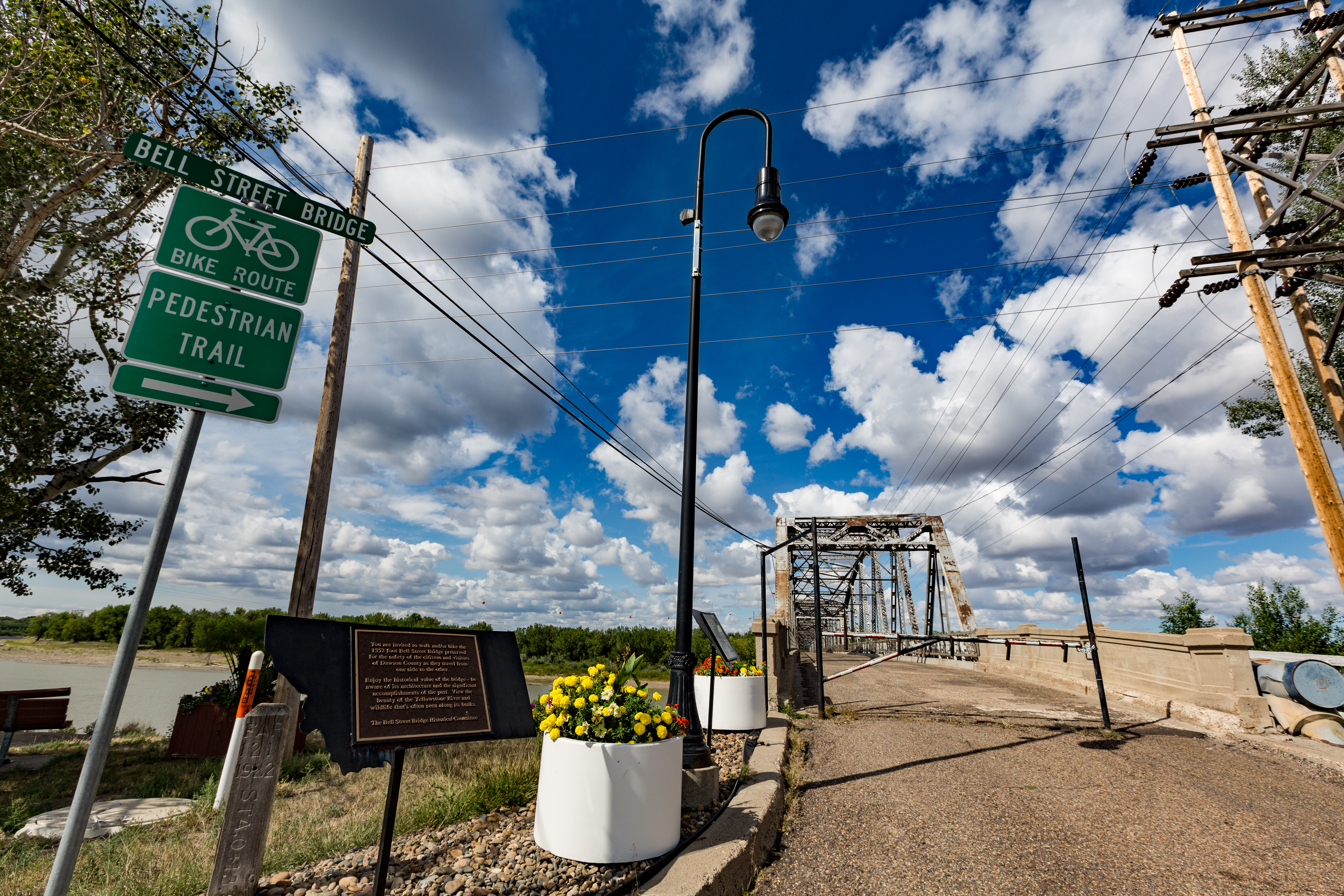
Bell Street Pedestrian/Bike Bridge

Since then, each year in September the town celebrates the preservation and birthday of the bridge which is a central piece of Glendive's historic resources.
