= Toston Bridge =

- U.S. National Register of Historic Places
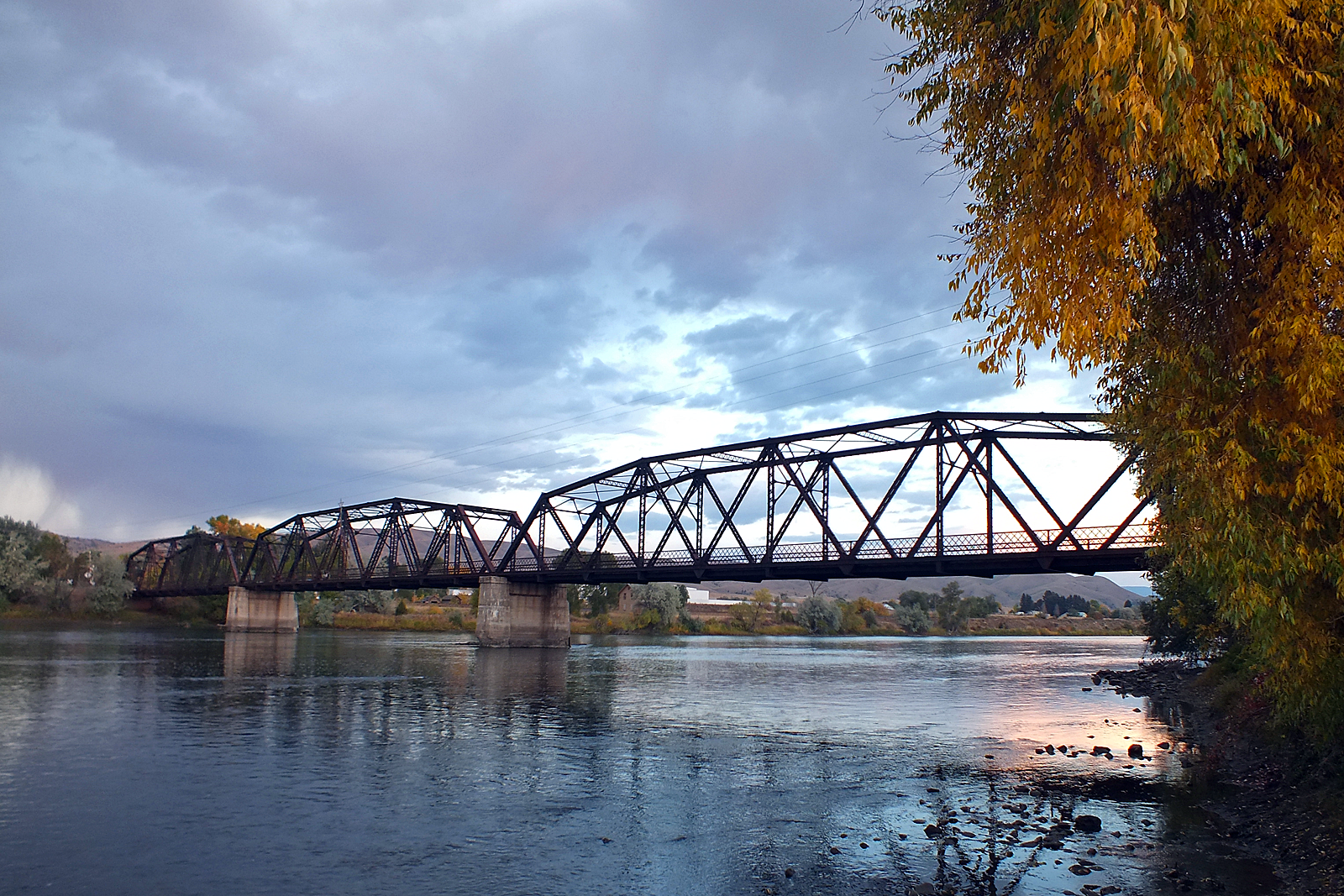

- Location within Montana Location within the United States
- Location: Spanning the Missouri River, on an abandoned segment of old U.S. Route 287, at Toston, MT
- Coordinates: 46°10′19″N 111°26′34″W
- Architectural style: Bridge
- NRHP reference No.: 05000720
- Added to NRHP: July 20, 2005

The Toston Bridge is a site on the National Register of Historic Places spanning the Missouri River, on an abandoned segment of old U.S. Route 287, at Toston, Montana. It was added to the Register on July 20, 2005.

It is a steel, three-span riveted Warren through truss bridge supported by two reinforced concrete piers and by reinforced concrete abutments. It is 525 feet (160 m) long, with three 175 feet (53 m)-long spans.

It crosses the Missouri River in an area where the river flows north.
