= Tarkio, Montana =

- Unincorporated community
- Location within Montana Location within the United States
- Coordinates: 47°1′17″N 114°42′20″W
- Country: United States
- State: Montana
- County: Mineral
- Elevation: 2,936 ft (895 m)
- Time zone: UTC-7 (Mountain (MST))
  - Summer (DST): UTC-6 (MDT)
- GNIS feature ID: 791898

Tarkio is an unincorporated community in Montana, United States, located in Mineral County. Tarkio falls in Mountain Time Zone (MST/MDT) and observes daylight saving time.

Tarkio's elevation is 2,936 feet (895 m) above sea level, and is approximately 40 miles (64 km) outside of Missoula. It lies along Interstate 90 with access via exit 61. The Clark Fork River flows to the west.
