= Prairie County, Montana =

County in Montana, United States

- County
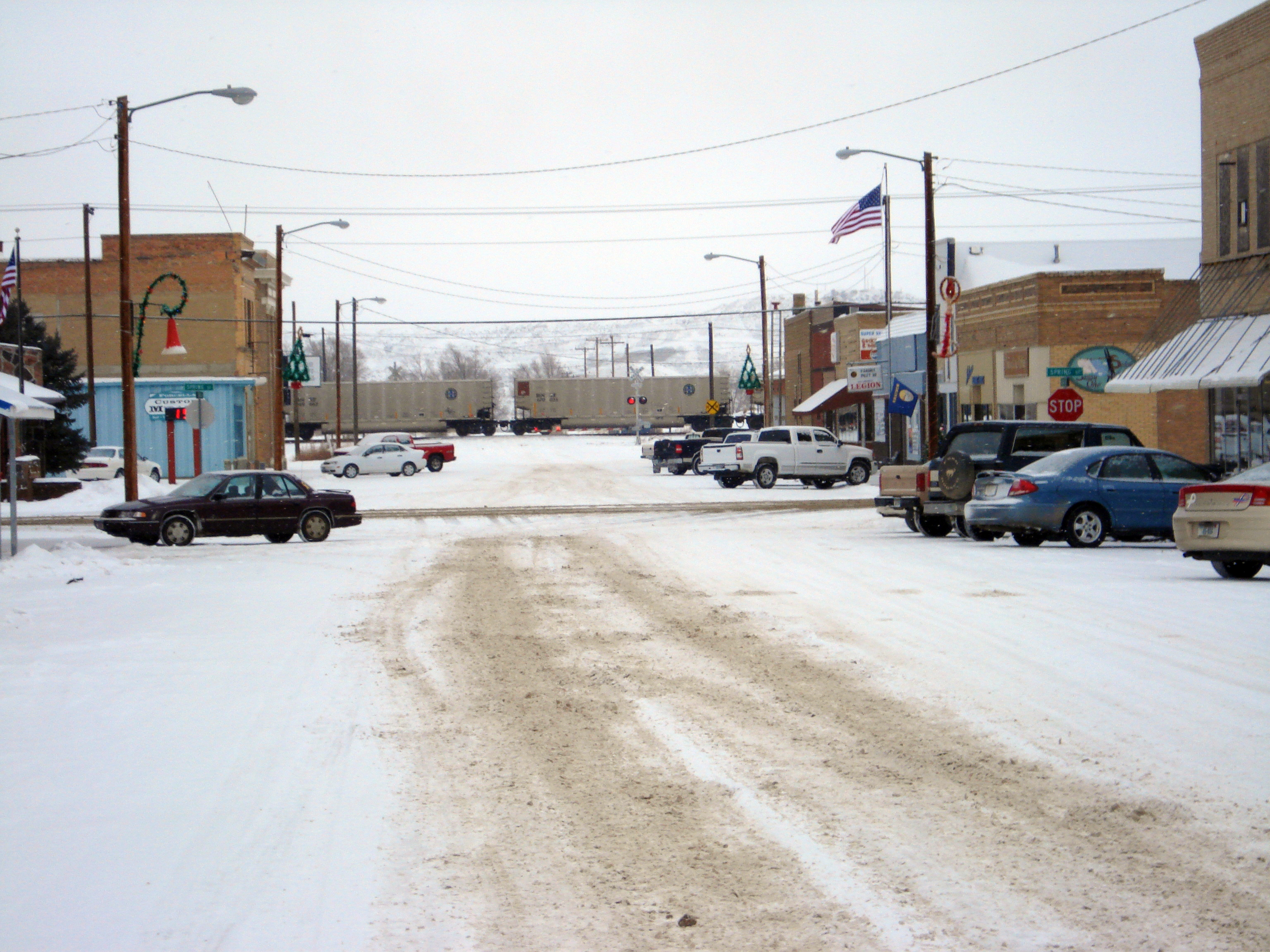
- Downtown Terry, Montana during a typical snowy day.

- Location within the U.S. state of Montana
- Coordinates: 46°51′N 105°22′W
- Country: United States
- State: Montana
- Founded: February 5, 1915
- Named for: Prairie landscape
- Seat: Terry
- Largest town: Terry

Area
  - Total: 1,743 sq mi (4,510 km^{2})
  - Land: 1,737 sq mi (4,500 km^{2})
  - Water: 5.8 sq mi (15 km^{2}) 0.3%

Population (2020)
  - Total: 1,088
  - Estimate (2025): 1,112 ▲
  - Density: 0.6/sq mi (0.23/km^{2})
- Time zone: UTC−7 (Mountain)
  - Summer (DST): UTC−6 (MDT)
- Congressional district: 2nd
- Website: prairiecountymt.gov
- Montana county number 45

Prairie County is a county in the U.S. state of Montana. As of the 2020 census, the population was 1,088, making it the fifth-least populous county in Montana. Its county seat is Terry. Prairie County was created by the Montana Legislature in 1915 out of parts of Custer, Dawson, and Fallon Counties. The name was selected in a contest and reflects the predominant landscape of the region.

The county was the site of the 1938 Custer Creek train wreck that killed 47 people and injured 75.

== Geography ==
According to the United States Census Bureau, the county has a total area of 1,743 square miles (4,510 km^{2}), of which 1,737 square miles (4,500 km^{2}) is land and 5.8 square miles (15 km^{2}) (0.3%) is water.

=== Major highways ===
- Interstate 94
- Montana Highway 253

=== Adjacent counties ===
- McCone County - north
- Dawson County - northeast
- Wibaux County - east
- Fallon County - southeast
- Custer County - south
- Garfield County - west

== Demographics ==
Historical population
Census	Pop.	Note	%±
1920	3,684		—
1930	3,941		7.0%
1940	2,410		−38.8%
1950	2,377		−1.4%
1960	2,318		−2.5%
1970	1,752		−24.4%
1980	1,836		4.8%
1990	1,383		−24.7%
2000	1,199		−13.3%
2010	1,179		−1.7%
2020	1,088		−7.7%
2025 (est.)	1,112	▲	2.2%
U.S. Decennial Census; 1790–1960, 1900–1990, 1990–2000, 2010–2020

=== 2020 census ===
As of the 2020 census, the county had a population of 1,088. Of the residents, 18.8% were under the age of 18 and 31.8% were 65 years of age or older; the median age was 52.8 years. For every 100 females there were 112.5 males, and for every 100 females age 18 and over there were 108.7 males. 0.0% of residents lived in urban areas and 100.0% lived in rural areas.

The racial makeup of the county was 92.3% White, 0.2% Black or African American, 1.2% American Indian and Alaska Native, 0.6% Asian, 0.0% from some other race, and 5.7% from two or more races. Hispanic or Latino residents of any race comprised 3.0% of the population.

There were 498 households in the county, of which 21.9% had children under the age of 18 living with them and 18.3% had a female householder with no spouse or partner present. About 31.8% of all households were made up of individuals and 17.8% had someone living alone who was 65 years of age or older.

There were 671 housing units, of which 25.8% were vacant. Among occupied housing units, 81.3% were owner-occupied and 18.7% were renter-occupied. The homeowner vacancy rate was 6.1% and the rental vacancy rate was 14.7%.

=== 2010 census ===
As of the 2010 census, there were 1,179 people, 551 households, and 342 families in the county. The population density was 0.7 inhabitants per square mile (0.27/km^{2}). There were 673 housing units at an average density of 0.4 per square mile (0.15/km^{2}). The racial makeup of the county was 96.4% white, 0.5% Asian, 0.2% American Indian, 0.2% from other races, and 2.8% from two or more races. Those of Hispanic or Latino origin made up 1.4% of the population. In terms of ancestry, 44.7% were German, 18.6% were Norwegian, 14.1% were American, 11.8% were Irish, and 9.5% were English.

Of the 551 households, 18.5% had children under the age of 18 living with them, 55.9% were married couples living together, 4.2% had a female householder with no husband present, 37.9% were non-families, and 34.1% of all households were made up of individuals. The average household size was 2.10 and the average family size was 2.67. The median age was 53.6 years.

The median income for a household in the county was $34,896 and the median income for a family was $43,500. Males had a median income of $28,438 versus $21,964 for females. The per capita income for the county was $21,296. About 12.4% of families and 16.9% of the population were below the poverty line, including 34.6% of those under age 18 and 14.5% of those age 65 or over.

== Politics ==
Voters in Prairie County have voted for Republican Party candidates in all national elections since 1948 (as of 2024).

United States presidential election results for Prairie County, Montana
Year	Republican		Democratic		Third party(ies)	
Year	No.	%	No.	%	No.	%
1916	535	45.38%	622	52.76%	22	1.87%
1920	881	76.68%	242	21.06%	26	2.26%
1924	683	56.21%	162	13.33%	370	30.45%
1928	968	70.20%	405	29.37%	6	0.44%
1932	634	45.71%	732	52.78%	21	1.51%
1936	454	33.31%	877	64.34%	32	2.35%
1940	597	51.42%	554	47.72%	10	0.86%
1944	598	55.68%	468	43.58%	8	0.74%
1948	499	47.89%	527	50.58%	16	1.54%
1952	771	69.21%	338	30.34%	5	0.45%
1956	637	61.25%	403	38.75%	0	0.00%
1960	649	65.75%	338	34.25%	0	0.00%
1964	555	52.96%	488	46.56%	5	0.48%
1968	635	67.77%	270	28.82%	32	3.42%
1972	685	68.57%	303	30.33%	11	1.10%
1976	597	58.59%	415	40.73%	7	0.69%
1980	580	62.57%	283	30.53%	64	6.90%
1984	693	69.93%	289	29.16%	9	0.91%
1988	541	60.11%	343	38.11%	16	1.78%
1992	412	48.13%	260	30.37%	184	21.50%
1996	417	53.46%	259	33.21%	104	13.33%
2000	541	72.52%	164	21.98%	41	5.50%
2004	546	74.18%	181	24.59%	9	1.22%
2008	503	68.44%	211	28.71%	21	2.86%
2012	520	73.97%	167	23.76%	16	2.28%
2016	556	80.70%	100	14.51%	33	4.79%
2020	603	81.05%	126	16.94%	15	2.02%
2024	546	79.25%	122	17.71%	21	3.05%

== Communities ==
=== Town ===
- Terry (county seat)

=== Census-designated place ===
- Fallon

=== Other communities ===
- Crow Rock
- McCloud
- Mildred
- Saugus
- Zero

== See also ==
- List of lakes in Prairie County, Montana
- National Register of Historic Places listings in Prairie County MT
