= Cameron, Montana =

Unincorporated community in Montana, U.S.

Coordinates: 45°12′12″N 111°40′43″W

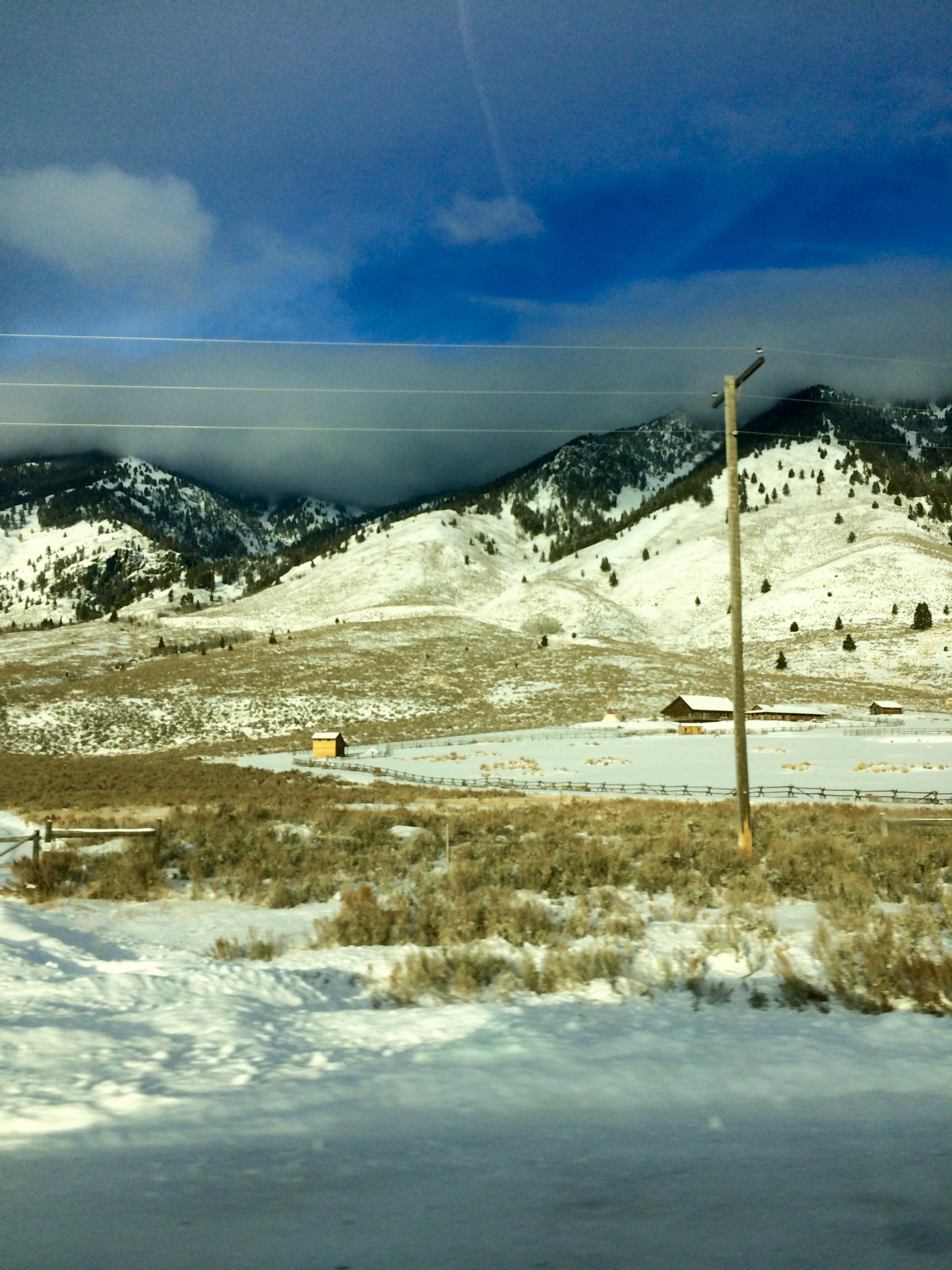
Cameron, Montana

Cameron is an unincorporated community in Madison County, Montana, United States.

The town is named after its founders, brothers James and Addison Bovey Cameron. Since 1919 the town has been located on U.S. Highway 287. The community is situated in a fertile valley that supports ranches. The valley abuts the Madison Range and the Sphinx Mountain is visible. The surrounding lands are part of Beaverhead–Deerlodge National Forest.
