= McCone County, Montana =

County in Montana, United States

- County
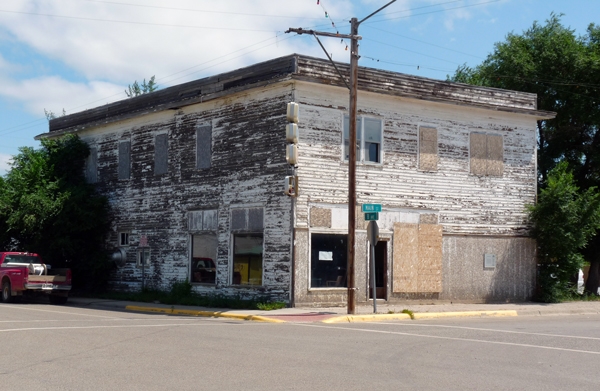
- Gladstone Hotel (Circle, Montana)

- Location within the U.S. state of Montana
- Coordinates: 47°39′N 105°48′W
- Country: United States
- State: Montana
- Founded: 1919
- Seat: Circle
- Largest town: Circle

Area
  - Total: 2,683 sq mi (6,950 km^{2})
  - Land: 2,643 sq mi (6,850 km^{2})
  - Water: 40 sq mi (100 km^{2}) 1.5%

Population (2020)
  - Total: 1,729
  - Estimate (2025): 1,720 ▼
  - Density: 0.6/sq mi (0.23/km^{2})
- Time zone: UTC−7 (Mountain)
  - Summer (DST): UTC−6 (MDT)
- Congressional district: 2nd
- Website: mcconecountymt.gov
- Montana county number 41

McCone County is a county located in the U.S. state of Montana. As of the 2020 census, the population was 1,729. Its county seat is Circle.

The county was created in 1919. It was named for State Senator George McCone, who had been one of the first county commissioners of Dawson County.

== Geography ==
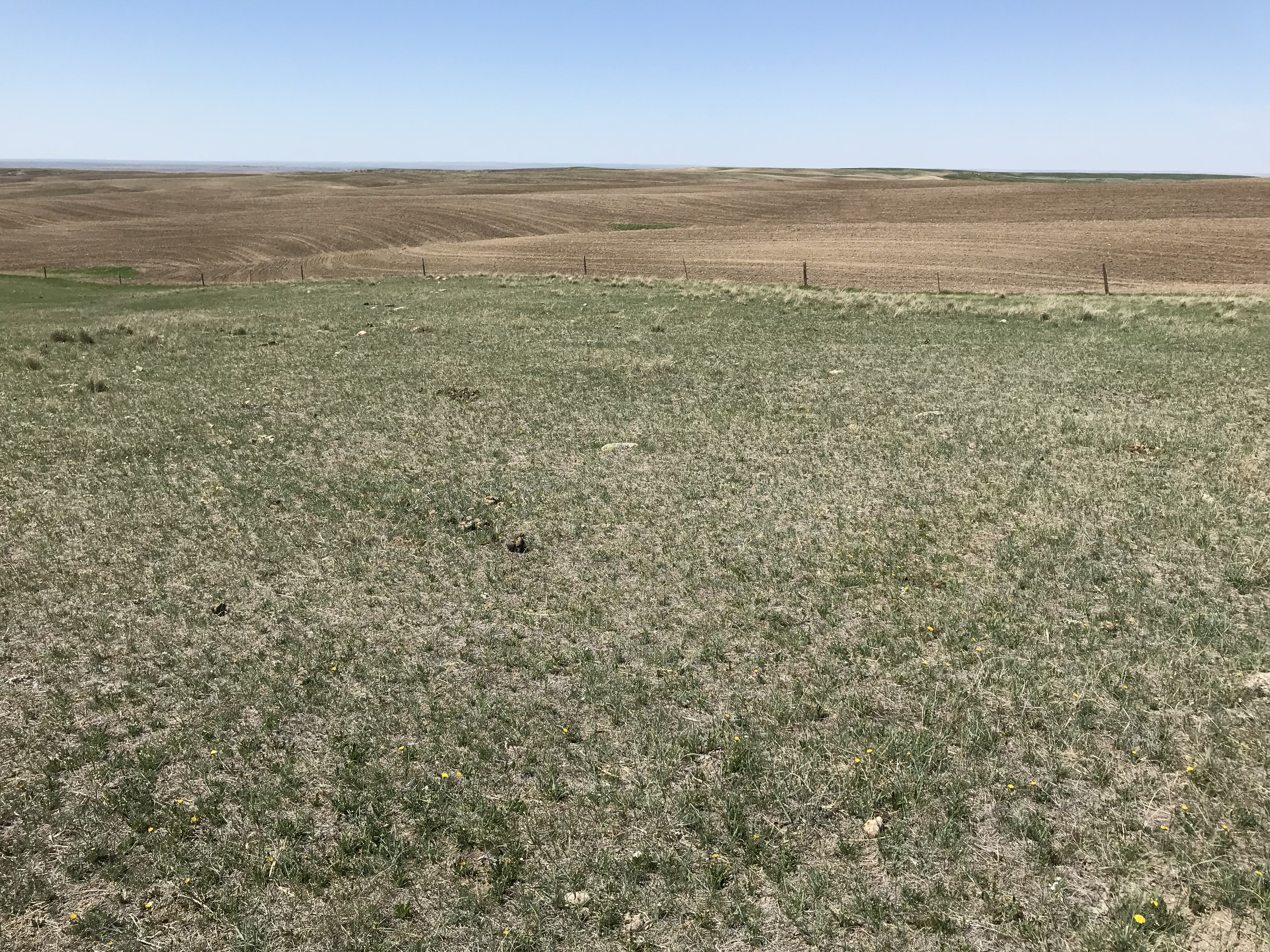
Typical McCone County landscape

According to the United States Census Bureau, the county has a total area of 2,683 square miles (6,950 km^{2}), of which 2,643 square miles (6,850 km^{2}) is land and 40 square miles (100 km^{2}) (1.5%) is water.

=== Major highways ===
- Montana Highway 13
- Montana Highway 24
- Montana Highway 200

=== Adjacent counties ===
- Valley County - west
- Roosevelt County - north
- Richland County - northeast
- Dawson County - east
- Prairie County - south
- Garfield County - west

=== National protected area ===
- Charles M. Russell National Wildlife Refuge (part)

== Demographics ==
Historical population
| Census | Pop. | Note | %± |
|---|---|---|---|
| 1920 | 4,747 | | — |
| 1930 | 4,790 | | 0.9% |
| 1940 | 3,744 | | −21.8% |
| 1950 | 3,258 | | −13.0% |
| 1960 | 3,321 | | 1.9% |
| 1970 | 2,875 | | −13.4% |
| 1980 | 2,702 | | −6.0% |
| 1990 | 2,276 | | −15.8% |
| 2000 | 1,977 | | −13.1% |
| 2010 | 1,734 | | −12.3% |
| 2020 | 1,729 | | −0.3% |
| 2025 (est.) | 1,720 | ▼ | −0.5% |
U.S. Decennial Census:

=== 2020 census ===
As of the 2020 census, the county had a population of 1,729. Of the residents, 21.7% were under the age of 18 and 23.6% were 65 years of age or older; the median age was 46.2 years. For every 100 females there were 104.1 males, and for every 100 females age 18 and over there were 106.9 males. 0.0% of residents lived in urban areas and 100.0% lived in rural areas.

The racial makeup of the county was 92.9% White, 0.1% Black or African American, 1.3% American Indian and Alaska Native, 0.5% Asian, 0.9% from some other race, and 4.3% from two or more races. Hispanic or Latino residents of any race comprised 1.9% of the population.

There were 747 households in the county, of which 25.0% had children under the age of 18 living with them and 18.1% had a female householder with no spouse or partner present. About 28.7% of all households were made up of individuals and 14.6% had someone living alone who was 65 years of age or older.

There were 1,025 housing units, of which 27.1% were vacant. Among occupied housing units, 80.6% were owner-occupied and 19.4% were renter-occupied. The homeowner vacancy rate was 2.1% and the rental vacancy rate was 14.7%.

=== 2010 census ===
As of the 2010 census, there were 1,734 people, 774 households, and 514 families living in the county. The population density was 0.7 inhabitants per square mile (0.27 inhabitants/km^{2}), the 10th lowest in the United States. There were 1,008 housing units at an average density of 0.4 units per square mile (0.15 units/km^{2}). The racial makeup of the county was 98.0% white, 0.4% American Indian, 0.1% black or African American, 0.1% Asian, 0.1% from other races, and 1.2% from two or more races. Those of Hispanic or Latino origin made up 0.7% of the population. In terms of ancestry, 44.5% were German, 23.1% were Norwegian, 12.7% were American, 12.0% were Irish, and 8.8% were English.

Of the 774 households, 23.4% had children under the age of 18 living with them, 61.0% were married couples living together, 3.2% had a female householder with no husband present, 33.6% were non-families, and 31.7% of all households were made up of individuals. The average household size was 2.22 and the average family size was 2.77. The median age was 48.9 years.

The median income for a household in the county was $48,167 and the median income for a family was $56,406. Males had a median income of $33,185 versus $26,454 for females. The per capita income for the county was $23,265. About 5.9% of families and 8.6% of the population were below the poverty line, including 10.3% of those under age 18 and 11.5% of those age 65 or over.

== Communities ==
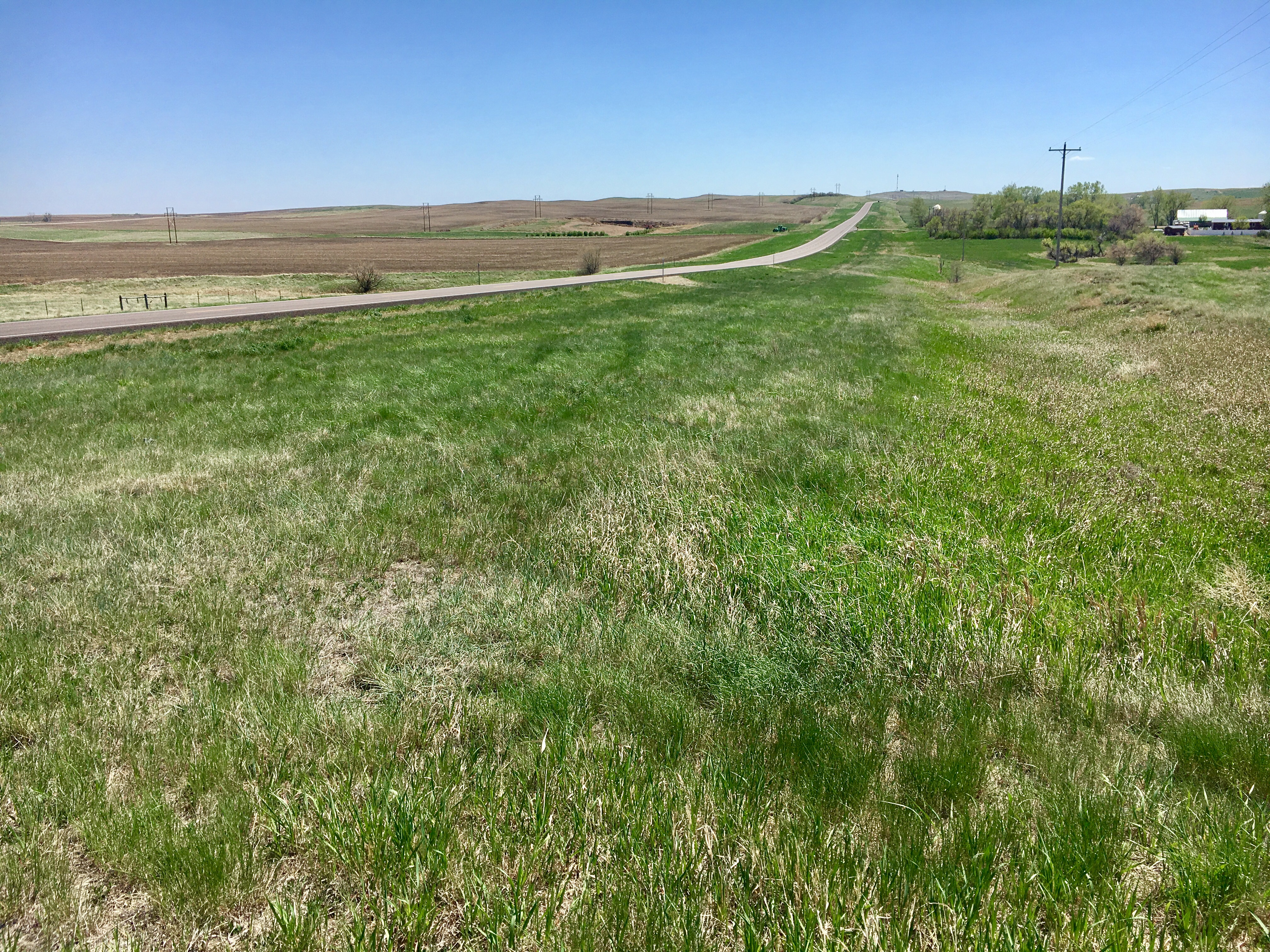
Looking south on MT 13 toward Vida

=== Town ===
- Circle (county seat)

=== Census-designated places ===
- Brockway
- Prairie Elk Colony
- Vida

=== Other unincorporated communities ===
- Nickwall
- Weldon

== Politics ==
McCone County is a solid Republican county. In the 2004 presidential election, McCone County gave 69.6% of its votes to President George W. Bush and 28.1% to Senator John Kerry. In the 2012 presidential election, Governor Mitt Romney received 75.0% of the county's votes, while President Barack Obama only received 22.5% of the votes.

United States presidential election results for McCone County, Montana
| Year | Republican | | Democratic | | Third party(ies) | |
| Year | No. | % | No. | % | No. | % |
|---|---|---|---|---|---|---|
| 1920 | 1,177 | 62.01% | 537 | 28.29% | 184 | 9.69% |
| 1924 | 494 | 38.18% | 143 | 11.05% | 657 | 50.77% |
| 1928 | 946 | 61.87% | 554 | 36.23% | 29 | 1.90% |
| 1932 | 456 | 26.34% | 1,020 | 58.93% | 255 | 14.73% |
| 1936 | 332 | 19.09% | 1,366 | 78.55% | 41 | 2.36% |
| 1940 | 529 | 35.24% | 928 | 61.83% | 44 | 2.93% |
| 1944 | 526 | 39.85% | 763 | 57.80% | 31 | 2.35% |
| 1948 | 518 | 37.78% | 702 | 51.20% | 151 | 11.01% |
| 1952 | 900 | 56.32% | 674 | 42.18% | 24 | 1.50% |
| 1956 | 752 | 45.83% | 889 | 54.17% | 0 | 0.00% |
| 1960 | 743 | 49.04% | 764 | 50.43% | 8 | 0.53% |
| 1964 | 615 | 40.81% | 891 | 59.12% | 1 | 0.07% |
| 1968 | 733 | 52.17% | 589 | 41.92% | 83 | 5.91% |
| 1972 | 854 | 58.29% | 562 | 38.36% | 49 | 3.34% |
| 1976 | 730 | 48.70% | 749 | 49.97% | 20 | 1.33% |
| 1980 | 1,000 | 67.98% | 349 | 23.73% | 122 | 8.29% |
| 1984 | 1,015 | 67.80% | 459 | 30.66% | 23 | 1.54% |
| 1988 | 814 | 58.18% | 567 | 40.53% | 18 | 1.29% |
| 1992 | 528 | 39.00% | 424 | 31.31% | 402 | 29.69% |
| 1996 | 615 | 48.96% | 390 | 31.05% | 251 | 19.98% |
| 2000 | 827 | 72.42% | 267 | 23.38% | 48 | 4.20% |
| 2004 | 791 | 69.57% | 320 | 28.14% | 26 | 2.29% |
| 2008 | 726 | 66.54% | 321 | 29.42% | 44 | 4.03% |
| 2012 | 745 | 75.03% | 223 | 22.46% | 25 | 2.52% |
| 2016 | 862 | 78.72% | 154 | 14.06% | 79 | 7.21% |
| 2020 | 956 | 84.75% | 155 | 13.74% | 17 | 1.51% |
| 2024 | 931 | 86.04% | 129 | 11.92% | 22 | 2.03% |

== See also ==
- List of lakes in McCone County, Montana
- List of mountains in McCone County, Montana
- National Register of Historic Places listings in McCone County MT
