= Fallon, Montana =

- CDP
- Location of Fallon, Montana
- Coordinates: 46°50′16″N 105°07′12″W
- Country: United States
- State: Montana
- County: Prairie

Area
  - Total: 5.29 sq mi (13.71 km^{2})
  - Land: 5.08 sq mi (13.16 km^{2})
  - Water: 0.22 sq mi (0.56 km^{2})
- Elevation: 2,202 ft (671 m)

Population (2020)
  - Total: 122
  - Density: 24.0/sq mi (9.27/km^{2})
- Time zone: UTC-7 (Mountain (MST))
  - Summer (DST): UTC-6 (MDT)
- ZIP codes: 59326, 59341
- Area code: 406
- FIPS code: 30-25375
- GNIS feature ID: 2408114

Fallon is an unincorporated town in Prairie County, Montana, United States. As of the 2020 census, Fallon had a population of 122. Although the town name has been co-opted for use by the United States Census Bureau as a census-designated place, this figure may include persons living well outside the town's limits.

The town and county are named after O’Fallon Creek, which is in turn named for Benjamin O'Fallon, an Indian agent for the upper Missouri region from 1823 to 1827.

== Geography ==
According to the United States Census Bureau, the CDP has a total area of 5.1 square miles (13 km^{2}), all land.

=== Climate ===
According to the Köppen Climate Classification system, Fallon has a semi-arid climate, abbreviated "BSk" on climate maps.

== Demographics ==
Historical population
Census	Pop.	Note	%±
2000	138		—
2010	164		18.8%
2020	122		−25.6%
U.S. Decennial Census

As of the census of 2000, there were 138 people, 63 households, and 36 families residing in the CDP. The population density was 27.2 inhabitants per square mile (10.5/km^{2}). There were 95 housing units at an average density of 18.7 per square mile (7.2/km^{2}). The racial makeup of the CDP was 98.55% White, 0.72% Native American, and 0.72% from two or more races.

There were 63 households, out of which 22.2% had children under the age of 18 living with them, 52.4% were married couples living together, 3.2% had a female householder with no husband present, and 41.3% were non-families. 31.7% of all households were made up of individuals, and 14.3% had someone living alone who was 65 years of age or older. The average household size was 2.19 and the average family size was 2.86.

In the CDP, the population was spread out, with 17.4% under the age of 18, 2.9% from 18 to 24, 28.3% from 25 to 44, 28.3% from 45 to 64, and 23.2% who were 65 years of age or older. The median age was 46 years. For every 100 females, there were 126.2 males. For every 100 females age 18 and over, there were 123.5 males.

The median income for a household in the CDP was $16,818, and the median income for a family was $16,250. Males had a median income of $23,500 versus $10,000 for females. The per capita income for the CDP was $9,701. There were 26.2% of families and 35.8% of the population living below the poverty line, including 68.4% of under eighteens and 22.7% of those over 64.
