= Cat Creek =

Cat Creek may refer to the following places in the United States:

- Cat Creek, Kentucky, a community in Powell County, Kentucky
- Cat Creek (Missouri), a stream in Missouri
- Cat Creek, Montana, a community in Petroleum County, Montana
  - Cat Creek Oil Field, an oil field in Petroleum County, Montana
- Cat Creek (Wisconsin), a stream in Wisconsin
