= Teagan =

Teagan is a surname and Irish unisex given name that means 'attractive', 'beautiful' or 'perfect'.

People with the surname or given name include:

- Linda Teagan (born 1944), an American attorney and politician
- Teagan Clive (born c. 1959), American bodybuilder, actress, and journalist
- Teagan Croft (born 2004), Australian actress
- Teagan Kavan (born 2005), American softball pitcher
- Teagan Micah (born 1997), Australian footballer
- Teagan O'Keeffe (born 1992), a South African female BMX rider
- Teagan Quitoriano (born 2000), American football player

== See also ==
- Tegan, a given name of Welsh origin
- Teigen (disambiguation)
- Ned Nefer and Teagan, a man/mannequin couple
