= Teigen =

Teigen can refer to

== People ==
- Chrissy Teigen, American model
- Dag Ole Teigen, Norwegian politician
- Jahn Teigen (1949–2020), Norwegian singer and musician
- Jorunn Teigen, Norwegian orienteering competitor
- Obert C. Teigen, Chief Justice on the North Dakota Supreme Court
- Ola Teigen, Norwegian politician
- Ole-Anton Teigen, Norwegian politician
- Teigen Allen, Australian football player
- Tell Teigen, Norwegian acrobat

== Places ==
- Teigen, Montana, an unincorporated community in western Petroleum County, Montana, United States
