= List of oil fields of Montana =

There are at least 45 named oil fields in Montana according to the U.S. Geological Survey, Board of Geographic Names. The USGS defines oil field as: "Area where petroleum is or was removed from the Earth."

An oil field is a region with an abundance of oil wells extracting petroleum (crude oil) from below ground. Because the oil reservoirs typically extend over a large area, possibly several hundred kilometres across, full exploitation entails multiple wells scattered across the area. In addition, there may be exploratory wells probing the edges, pipelines to transport the oil elsewhere, and support facilities.

The Schlumberger Oilfield Glossary defines oil field as: "An accumulation, pool or group of pools of oil in the subsurface. An oil field consists of a reservoir in a shape that will trap hydrocarbons and that is covered by an impermeable or sealing rock. Typically, industry professionals use the term with an implied assumption of economic size."

- Arch Apex Gas Field, Toole County, Montana, 48°54′27″N 111°21′32″W, el. 4,039 feet (1,231 m)
- Bascom Oil Field, Rosebud County, Montana, 46°39′08″N 107°47′25″W, el. 2,838 feet (865 m)
- Bears Den Oil and Gas Field, Liberty County, Montana, 48°52′43″N 111°00′12″W, el. 4,101 feet (1,250 m)
- Belle Creek Oil Field, Powder River County, Montana, 45°06′33″N 105°05′06″W, el. 3,638 feet (1,109 m)
- Big Wall Oil Field, Musselshell County, Montana, 46°37′00″N 108°22′47″W, el. 3,291 feet (1,003 m)
- Bowes Oil Field, Blaine County, Montana, 48°28′43″N 109°14′25″W, el. 3,015 feet (919 m)
- Brorson Oil Field, Richland County, Montana, 47°47′58″N 104°18′03″W, el. 2,428 feet (740 m)
- Cabin Creek Oil Field, Fallon County, Montana, 46°36′25″N 104°27′26″W, el. 2,848 feet (868 m)
- Cupton Oil Field, Fallon County, Montana, 46°32′58″N 104°18′32″W, el. 3,018 feet (920 m)
- Devon Gas Field, Toole County, Montana, 48°34′44″N 111°29′21″W, el. 3,317 feet (1,011 m)
- East Poplar Oil Field, Roosevelt County, Montana, 48°12′26″N 105°06′16″W, el. 2,110 feet (640 m)
- Elk Basin Oil Field, Carbon County, Montana, 45°01′04″N 108°54′33″W, el. 4,393 feet (1,339 m)
- Flat Coulee Oil and Gas Field, Liberty County, Montana, 48°58′17″N 111°03′43″W, el. 3,570 feet (1,090 m)
- Flat Lake Oil Field, Sheridan County, Montana, 48°59′20″N 104°05′07″W, el. 2,178 feet (664 m)
- Fred and George Creek Oil and Gas Field, Toole County, Montana, 48°56′35″N 111°27′25″W, el. 4,003 feet (1,220 m)
- Gas City Oil Field, Dawson County, Montana, 46°55′16″N 104°44′17″W, el. 2,175 feet (663 m)
- Glendive Oil Field, Dawson County, Montana, 47°01′23″N 104°50′25″W, el. 2,346 feet (715 m)
- Grandview Oil and Gas Field, Liberty County, Montana, 48°41′58″N 111°11′53″W, el. 3,606 feet (1,099 m)
- Ivanhoe Dome Oil Field, Musselshell County, Montana, 46°43′12″N 107°50′28″W, el. 2,940 feet (900 m)
- Keg Coulee Oil Field, Musselshell County, Montana, 46°41′00″N 107°53′39″W, el. 2,949 feet (899 m)
- Keith Gas Field, Liberty County, Montana, 48°52′44″N 110°53′28″W, el. 3,442 feet (1,049 m)
- Kevin Sunburst Oil Field, Toole County, Montana, 48°47′06″N 112°00′59″W, el. 3,530 feet (1,080 m)
- Little Beaver East Oil Field, Bowman County, Montana, 46°06′14″N 104°01′42″W, el. 2,999 feet (914 m)
- Little Beaver Oil Field, Fallon County, Montana, 46°06′04″N 104°05′09″W, el. 3,084 feet (940 m)
- Melstone Oil Field, Musselshell County, Montana, 46°36′51″N 108°03′08″W, el. 3,058 feet (932 m)
- Monarch Oil Field, Fallon County, Montana, 46°30′48″N 104°22′50″W, el. 3,018 feet (920 m)
- Mosby Dome Cat Creek Oil Field, Petroleum County, Montana, 47°03′00″N 107°55′18″W, el. 2,454 feet (748 m)
- Mosser Dome Oil Field, Yellowstone County, Montana, 45°32′43″N 108°43′49″W, el. 4,327 feet (1,319 m)
- North Pine Oil Field, Dawson County, Montana, 46°53′21″N 104°42′20″W, el. 2,447 feet (746 m)
- Northwest Sumatra Oil Field, Rosebud County, Montana, 46°42′33″N 107°41′17″W, el. 3,110 feet (950 m)
- Oil Hills, Park County, Montana, 46°10′43″N 110°40′03″W, el. 6,368 feet (1,941 m)
- Pennel Oil Field, Fallon County, Montana, 46°23′46″N 104°15′14″W, el. 2,986 feet (910 m)
- Prairie Dell Oil and Gas Field, Toole County, Montana, 48°38′33″N 111°53′15″W, el. 3,517 feet (1,072 m)
- Ragged Point Oil Field, Musselshell County, Montana, 46°44′23″N 107°58′14″W, el. 2,890 feet (880 m)
- Rattlesnake Butte Oil Field, Petroleum County, Montana, 46°52′20″N 108°10′02″W, el. 3,222 feet (982 m)
- Reagan Camp Oil Field, Glacier County, Montana, 48°58′31″N 112°30′46″W, el. 4,108 feet (1,252 m)
- S W Kevin Gas Field, Toole County, Montana, 48°39′27″N 111°58′06″W, el. 3,373 feet (1,028 m)
- Soap Creek Oilfield, Big Horn County, Montana, 45°16′22″N 107°46′25″W, el. 3,612 feet (1,101 m)
- South Pine Oil Field, Wibaux County, Montana, 46°44′29″N 104°33′42″W, el. 2,638 feet (804 m)
- South Wills Creek Oil Field, Fallon County, Montana, 46°33′22″N 104°22′40″W, el. 2,913 feet (888 m)
- Stensvad Oil Field, Rosebud County, Montana, 46°43′50″N 107°46′38″W, el. 2,907 feet (886 m)
- Tiger Ridge Gas Field, Hill County, Montana, 48°32′03″N 109°48′46″W, el. 2,589 feet (789 m)
- Utopia Gas and Oil Field, Liberty County, Montana, 48°36′53″N 111°11′01″W, el. 3,409 feet (1,039 m)
- West Dome Cat Creek Oil Field, Petroleum County, Montana, 47°04′02″N 107°59′50″W, el. 2,766 feet (843 m)
- Whitlash Gas and Oil Field, Liberty County, Montana, 48°57′42″N 111°14′30″W, el. 3,757 feet (1,145 m)

== See also ==
- Bakken formation
