= Tegan =

Female given name

- Pronunciation: Welsh pronunciation: [ˈtɛgan] English: /ˈtiːɡən/

Origin
- Language: Welsh
- Meaning: "beautiful," "loved one," "favourite,"“blessed” "toy."

Tegan is a given name of Welsh origin. It is a diminutive of the Welsh word teg ('fair') and historically meant 'darling', 'loved one', or 'favourite'. In modern Welsh it is the usual word for 'toy'. It is rare as a personal name in Wales and England.

== Women ==
- Tegan Bertolissio (born 2006), Australian soccer player
- Tegan Cunningham (born 1988), Australian basketball player
- Tegan Bennett Daylight (born 1969), Australian author
- Tegan Fourie (born 1998), South African field hockey player
- Tegan French (born 1983), Australian rugby union player
- Tegan Graham (born 1997), New Zealand basketball player
- Tegan Higginbotham (born 1988), Australian comedian and actress
- Tegan Malone, American politician
- Tegan Marie (born 2003), American country singer and songwriter
- Tegan Martin (born 1992), Australian model and beauty pageant titleholder, Miss Universe Australia 2014, and Top 10 Miss Universe 2014
- Tegan McCarthy (born 1997), Papua New Guinean swimmer
- Tegan McGrady (born 1997), American professional soccer player
- Tegan McPharlin (born 1988), Australian cricketer
- Tegan Moss (born 1985), Canadian actress
- Tegan Nox (born 1994), Welsh professional wrestler
- Tegan Philip (born 1988), Australian netball player
- Tegan Quin (born 1980), Canadian singer-songwriter, half of the duo Tegan and Sara
- Tegan Riding (born 1993), Australian football player
- Tegan Stimson, South African born Australian actress

== Men ==
- Tegan Chambers (born 1999), Jamaican-American rapper and singer-songwriter
- Tegan Finn (born 2008), English professional footballer
- Tegan Kuhns (born 2005), American professional baseball player
- Tegan West (born 1959), American actor and writer

== Fictional characters ==
- Tegan Callahan, fictional character in the Australian television series Home and Away
- Tegan Freedman, fictional character in the Australian television series Neighbours
- Tegan Jovanka, fictional character in the British television series Doctor Who
- Tegan Lomax, fictional character in the British television series Hollyoaks
- PC Tegan Thompson, fictional character in the British television series No Offence
- Tegan Price, fictional character in the US television series How to Get Away with Murder

== See also ==
- Tegen, a Cornish female name
- Teagan, a surname and Irish female given name
