= County statistics of the United States =

In 45 of the 50 states of the United States, the county is used for the level of local government immediately below the state itself. Louisiana uses parishes, and Alaska uses boroughs. In Connecticut, Massachusetts, and Rhode Island, some or all counties within states have no governments of their own; the counties continue to exist as legal entities, however, and are used by states for some administrative functions and by the United States Census bureau for statistical analysis. There are 3,242 counties and county equivalent administrative units in total, including the District of Columbia and 100 county-equivalents in the U.S. territories.

There are 41 independent cities in the United States. In Virginia, any municipality that is incorporated as a city legally becomes independent of any county. Where indicated, the statistics below do not include Virginia's 38 independent cities.

In Alaska, most of the land area of the state has no county-level government. Those parts of the state are divided by the United States Census Bureau into census areas, which are not the same as boroughs. The state's largest statistical division by area is the Yukon–Koyukuk Census Area, which is larger than any of the state's boroughs. Although Anchorage is called a municipality, it is considered a consolidated city and borough.

There are 100 county-equivalents in the territories of the United States: they are the 3 districts and 2 atolls of American Samoa, all of Guam (Guam as one single county-equivalent), the 4 municipalities in the Northern Mariana Islands, the 78 municipalities of Puerto Rico, the 3 main islands of the U.S. Virgin Islands, and the 9 islands in the U.S. Minor Outlying Islands. All of these territorial county-equivalents are defined by the U.S. Census Bureau.

== Count ==
This is the number of counties and county-equivalents for each state, the District of Columbia, the 5 inhabited territories of the United States, and the U.S. Minor Outlying Islands.

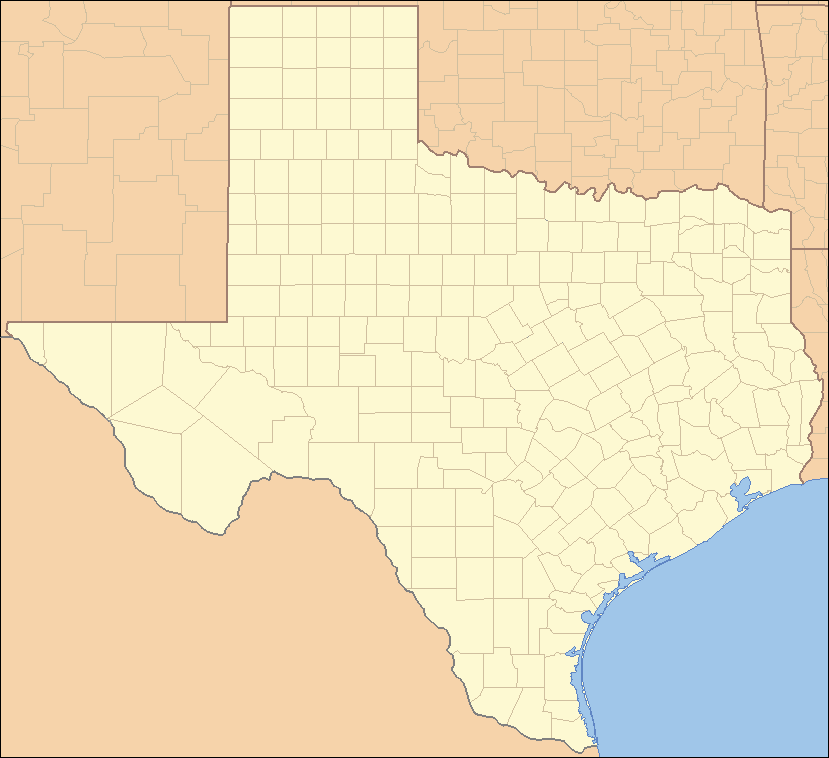
Texas has 254 counties, the most of any state

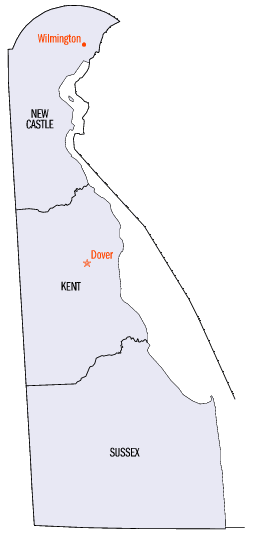
Delaware has three counties, the fewest of any state

Lists of counties and county equivalents by number per political division:

Count	State, federal district or territory	Notes
254	Texas	The most counties of any U.S. state
159	(Georgia (U.S. state)) Georgia	
133	Virginia	95 counties and 38 independent cities
120	Kentucky	
115	Missouri	114 counties and 1 independent city
105	Kansas	
102	Illinois	
100	North Carolina	
99	Iowa	
95	Tennessee	
93	Nebraska	
92	Indiana	
88	Ohio	
87	Minnesota	
83	Michigan	
82	Mississippi	
78	Puerto Rico	Puerto Rico has no counties. The 78 municipalities of Puerto Rico are counted as county-equivalents by the U.S. Census Bureau
77	Oklahoma	
75	Arkansas	
72	Wisconsin	
67	Alabama	
67	Florida	
67	Pennsylvania	
66	South Dakota	
64	Colorado	
64	Louisiana	Louisiana has no counties. The 64 parishes of Louisiana are counted as county-equivalents by the U.S. Census Bureau
62	(New York (state)) New York	New York City is a sui generis jurisdiction, in which the city government consists of 5 boroughs each coterminous with a county of the State of New York
58	California	
56	Montana	
55	West Virginia	
53	North Dakota	
46	South Carolina	
44	Idaho	
39	(Washington (state)) Washington	
36	Oregon	
33	New Mexico	
30	Alaska	Alaska has no counties. The following areas in Alaska are counted as county-equivalents: the 19 organized boroughs and, in its Unorganized Borough, 11 designated census areas
29	Utah	
24	Maryland	23 counties and 1 independent city
23	Wyoming	
21	New Jersey	
17	Nevada	16 counties and 1 independent city
16	Maine	
15	Arizona	
14	Massachusetts	8 of the 14 counties in Massachusetts were disincorporated in the 1990s and early 2000s; local government in these areas consists of cities and towns. Only one of the remaining 6 counties is a consolidated town-county
14	Vermont	
10	New Hampshire	
9	(United States) U.S. Minor Outlying Islands	The U.S. Minor Outlying Islands does not have counties. The 9 islands in the U.S. Minor Outlying Islands are counted as county-equivalents by the U.S. Census Bureau
9	Connecticut	The U.S. Census Bureau uses Connecticut's nine planning regions instead of its eight historic counties for statistical purposes.
5	American Samoa	The 3 districts and 2 unorganized atolls of American Samoa are counted as county-equivalents by the U.S. Census Bureau. American Samoa locally has 14 "counties", but these "counties" are not counted as counties by the U.S. Census Bureau (they are treated as "minor civil divisions")
5	Hawaii	
5	Rhode Island	Counties in Rhode Island have no governmental functions; local government is provided by eight cities and thirty-one towns
4	Northern Mariana Islands	The Northern Mariana Islands has no counties. The 4 municipalities of the Northern Mariana Islands are counted as county-equivalents by the U.S. Census Bureau
3	Delaware	The fewest counties of any U.S. state
3	(United States Virgin Islands) Virgin Islands (U.S.)	The U.S. Virgin Islands has no counties. The 3 main islands of the U.S. Virgin Islands are counted as county-equivalents by the U.S. Census Bureau
1	(Washington, D.C.) District of Columbia	The District of Columbia has no counties; the District of Columbia is considered both a state-equivalent and a county equivalent for statistical purposes
1	Guam	Guam has no counties; Guam is considered both a state-equivalent and a county-equivalent for statistical purposes by the U.S. Census Bureau (similar to the District of Columbia)

- Total (50 states and District of Columbia): 3,143 (3,007 counties and 136 county equivalents)
- Total (50 states, District of Columbia and territories): 3,244 (3,007 counties and 236 county equivalents)
- Average number of counties per state (not including D.C. and the territories): 62.84 (Note: Number produced by diving 3,142 by 50 — Note it is 3,142 and not 3,143 (because the District of Columbia is not counted))
- Average number of counties per state (including D.C. and the territories): 56.8947368421 (Note: Number produced by dividing 3,243 by 57 (the number 57 represents the 50 states, the District of Columbia, the 5 inhabited territories, and the U.S. Minor Outlying Islands as one entity)

== Population ==
=== Nationwide population extremes ===
These rankings include county equivalents.

Largest population counties nationwide (2025 Census estimate)
Rank	County	Population
1	Los Angeles County, California	9,694,934
2	Cook County, Illinois	5,194,625
3	Harris County, Texas	5,045,026
4	Maricopa County, Arizona	4,689,558
5	San Diego County, California	3,282,248
6	Orange County, California	3,149,507
7	Miami-Dade County, Florida	2,802,029
8	Dallas County, Texas	2,661,397
9	Kings County, New York	2,653,963
10	Riverside County, California	2,544,916
11	Clark County, Nevada	2,407,226
12	Queens County, New York	2,358,182
13	King County, Washington	2,344,939
14	Tarrant County, Texas	2,248,466
15	San Bernardino County, California	2,224,091
16	Bexar County, Texas	2,160,088
17	Broward County, Florida	2,013,317
18	Santa Clara County, California	1,914,391
19	Wayne County, Michigan	1,769,038
20	New York County, New York	1,664,862

Smallest population counties nationwide (2025 Census estimate)
Rank	County	Population
1	Loving County, Texas	52
2	Kalawao County, Hawaii	82
3	King County, Texas	192
4	Kenedy County, Texas	319
5	McPherson County, Nebraska	369
6	Arthur County, Nebraska	396
7	Blaine County, Nebraska	458
8	McMullen County, Texas	544
9	Petroleum County, Montana	548
10	Grant County, Nebraska	561
11	Borden County, Texas	567
12	Loup County, Nebraska	570
13	Harding County, New Mexico	617
14	Slope County, North Dakota	628
15	Thomas County, Nebraska	639
16	Logan County, Nebraska	669
17	City and Borough of Yakutat, Alaska	672
18	Kent County, Texas	674
19	Banner County, Nebraska	686
20	Hooker County, Nebraska	686

The following is a list of the least populous counties and county-equivalents in all U.S. territory. The first 9 counties (county-equivalents) are uninhabited, while the 10th on the list (Palmyra Atoll) has a small non-permanent human population whose maximum capacity is 20 people.

Smallest population counties in all U.S. territory (2020 Census)
Rank	County	Population
1	Baker Island, U.S. Minor Outlying Islands	0
2	Howland Island, U.S. Minor Outlying Islands	0
3	Jarvis Island, U.S. Minor Outlying Islands	0
4	Johnston Atoll, U.S. Minor Outlying Islands	0
5	Kingman Reef, U.S. Minor Outlying Islands	0
6	Navassa Island, U.S. Minor Outlying Islands	0
7	Northern Islands Municipality, Northern Mariana Islands	0
8	Rose Atoll, American Samoa	0
9	Swains Island, American Samoa	0
10	Palmyra Atoll, U.S. Minor Outlying Islands	20 (Note: Non-permanent human population)

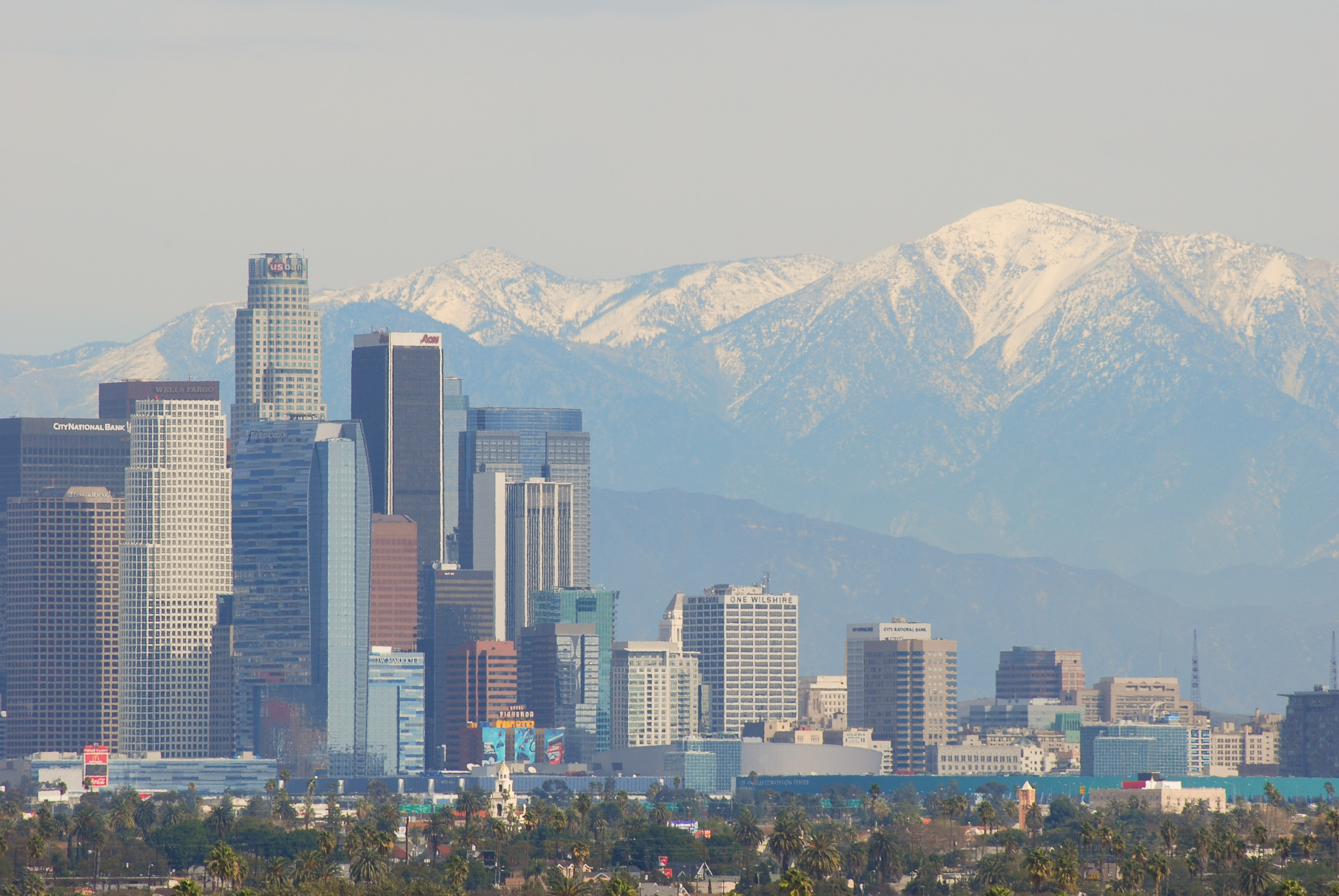
Los Angeles in Los Angeles County, California, the most populous county in the United States

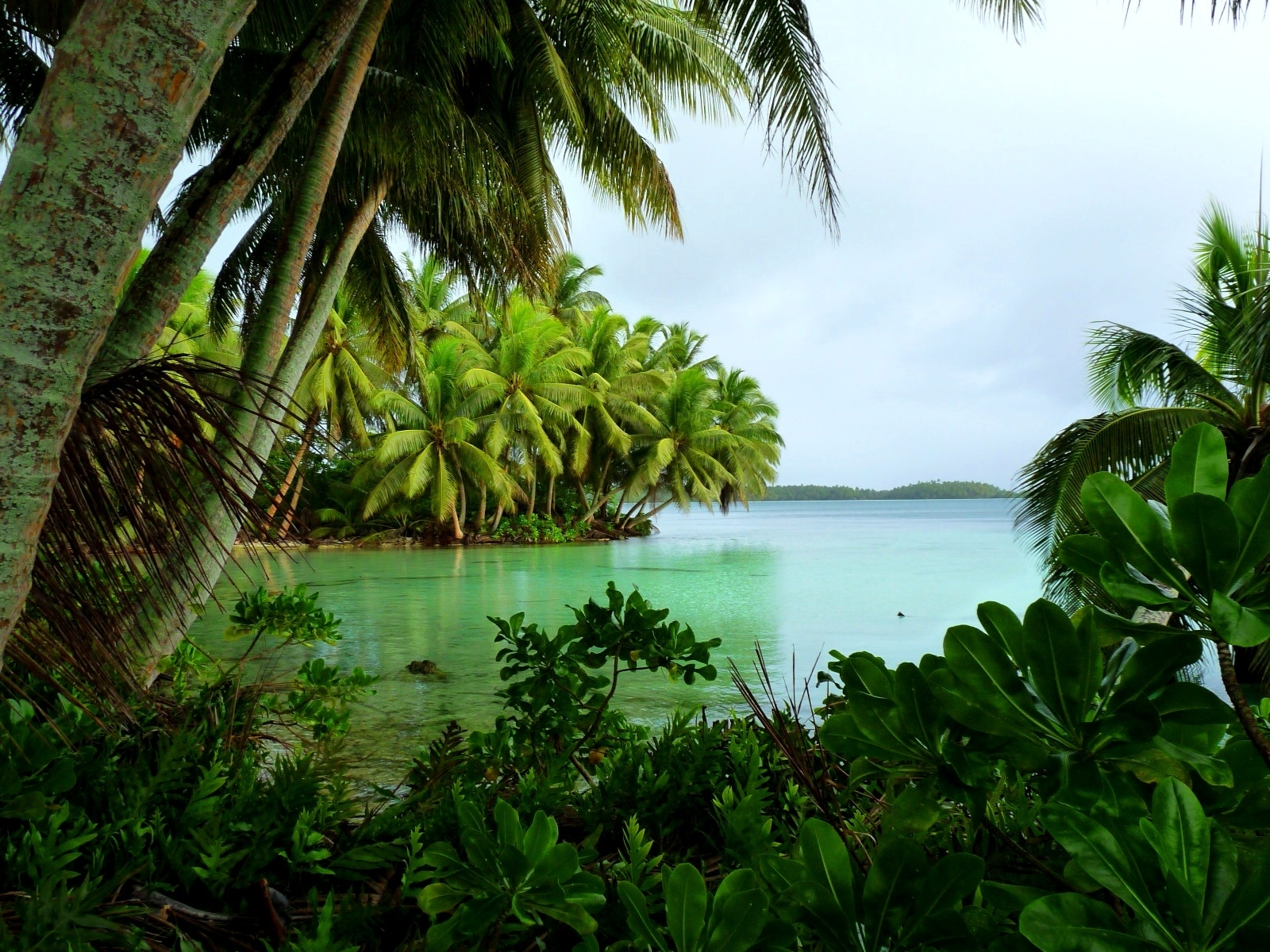
Palmyra Atoll — the least-populous inhabited (Note: Non-permanent human population) county or county-equivalent in the United States

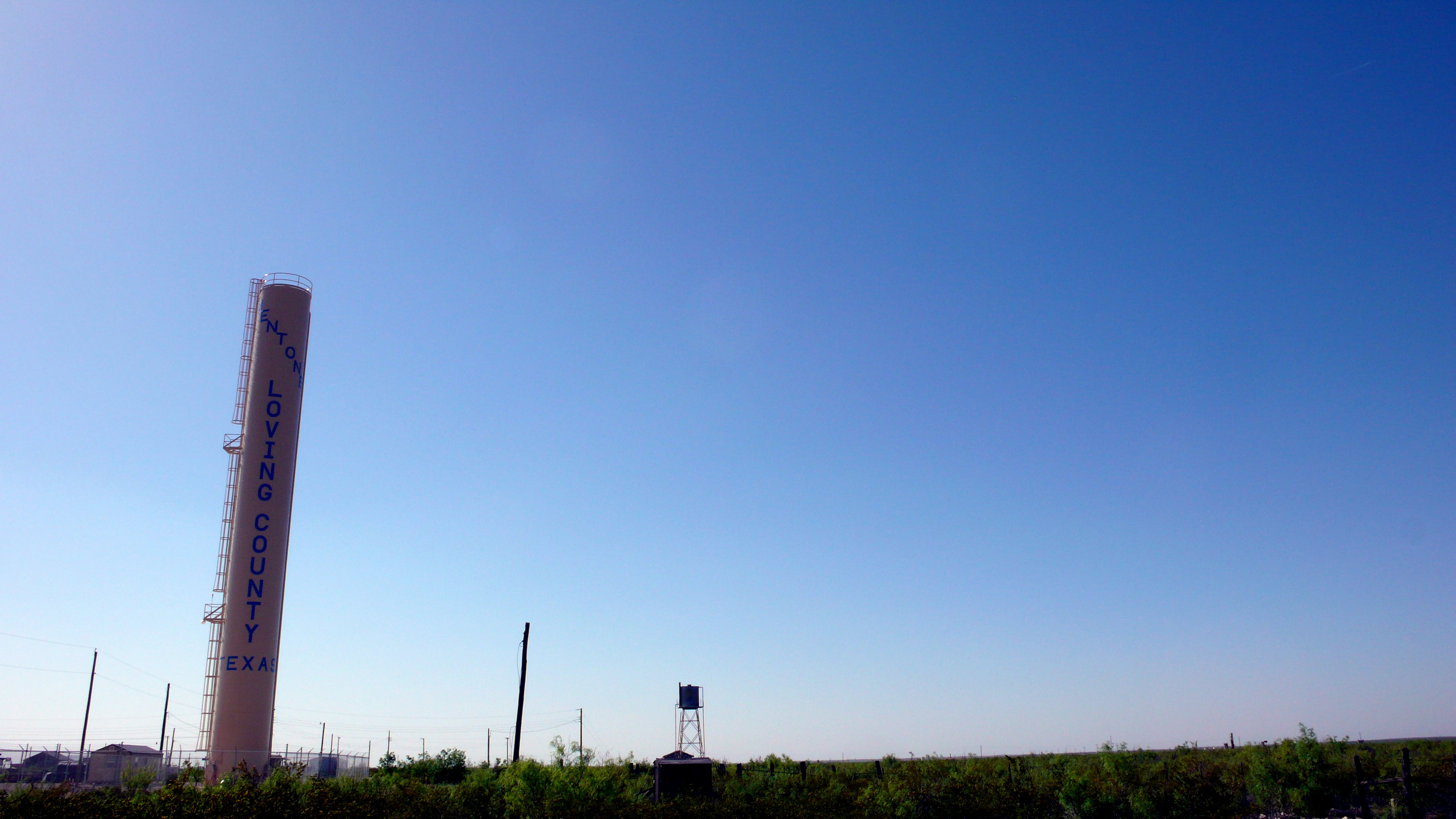
Loving County, Texas, the least populous county in the main 50-states in the United States.

=== Population per state or territory ===
Most and least populous counties per state/territory (2021 Census estimate)
State, federal district, or territory	Least populous	Population	Most populous	Population
Alabama	Greene	7,629	Jefferson	667,820
Alaska	Yakutat	704	Anchorage	288,121
American Samoa	Rose Atoll	0	Western District	31,819
Arizona	Greenlee	9,404	Maricopa	4,496,588
Arkansas	Calhoun	4,741	Pulaski	397,821
California	Alpine	1,235	Los Angeles	9,829,544
Colorado	San Juan	733	El Paso	737,867
Connecticut	Windham	116,418	Fairfield	959,768
Delaware	Kent	184,149	New Castle	571,708
District of Columbia	District of Columbia (Note: The District of Columbia has only one county-equivalent: itself.)	670,050	District of Columbia	670,050
Florida	Liberty	7,900	Miami-Dade	2,662,777
(Georgia (U.S. state)) Georgia	Taliaferro	1,558	Fulton	1,065,334
Guam	Guam (Note: Guam has only one county-equivalent: itself.)	153,835	Guam	153,835
Hawaii	Kalawao	82	Honolulu	1,000,890
Idaho	Clark	792	Ada	511,931
Illinois	Hardin	3,650	Cook	5,173,146
Indiana	Ohio	5,978	Marion	971,102
Iowa	Adams	3,641	Polk	496,844
Kansas	Greeley	1,304	Johnson	613,219
Kentucky	Robertson	2,257	Jefferson	777,874
Louisiana	Tensas	4,043	East Baton Rouge	453,301
Maine	Piscataquis	17,165	Cumberland	305,231
Maryland	Kent	19,270	Montgomery	1,054,827
Massachusetts	Nantucket	14,491	Middlesex	1,614,742
Michigan	Keweenaw	2,107	Wayne	1,774,816
Minnesota	Traverse	3,286	Hennepin	1,267,416
Mississippi	Issaquena	1,280	Hinds	222,679
Missouri	Worth	1,983	St. Louis	997,187
Montana	Petroleum	519	Yellowstone	167,146
Nebraska	McPherson	379	Douglas	585,008
Nevada	Esmeralda	743	Clark	2,292,476
New Hampshire	Coos	31,268	Hillsborough	422,937
New Jersey	Salem	65,046	Bergen	953,819
New Mexico	Harding	639	Bernalillo	674,393
New York	Hamilton	5,119	Kings	2,641,052
North Carolina	Tyrrell	3,254	Wake	1,150,204
North Dakota	Slope	690	Cass	186,562
Northern Mariana Islands	Northern Islands Municipality	7	Saipan Municipality	43,385
Ohio	Vinton	12,696	Franklin	1,321,414
Oklahoma	Cimarron	2,248	Oklahoma	798,575
Oregon	Wheeler	1,451	Multnomah	803,377
Pennsylvania	Cameron	4,459	Philadelphia	1,576,251
Puerto Rico	Culebra Municipality	1,792	San Juan Municipality	342,259
Rhode Island	Bristol	50,818	Providence	658,221
South Carolina	Allendale	7,858	Greenville	533,834
South Dakota	Jones	879	Minnehaha	199,685
Tennessee	Pickett	5,079	Shelby	924,454
Texas	Loving	57	Harris	4,728,030
(United States) U.S. Minor Outlying Islands*	6 entities (Note: The 6 county-equivalents in the U.S. Minor Outlying Islands with zero people are Baker Island, Howland Island, Jarvis Island, Johnston Atoll, Kingman Reef and Navassa Island. The other 3 island territories in the U.S. Minor Outlying Islands have small non-permanent human populations.)	0	Wake Island	100 (Note: Wake Island’s population is non-permanent.)
Utah	Daggett	976	Salt Lake	1,186,421
Vermont	Essex	5,925	Chittenden	168,865
(United States Virgin Islands) Virgin Islands (U.S.)	Saint John Island	3,881	Saint Thomas Island	42,261
Virginia	Highland	2,226	Fairfax	1,139,720
Washington	Garfield	2,286	King	2,269,675
West Virginia	Wirt	5,063	Kanawha	177,952
Wisconsin	Menominee	4,289	Milwaukee	928,059
Wyoming	Niobrara	2,438	Laramie	100,863

== Area ==
=== Nationwide land area extremes ===
The largest counties and county-equivalents are organized boroughs and the census areas of Alaska with the top two being Yukon–Koyukuk Census Area (145,504.79 sq mi or 376,855.7 km^{2}) and North Slope Borough (88,695.41 sq mi or 229,720.1 km^{2}). The smallest counties and county equivalents (in the 50 states) are the independent cities of Virginia with the extreme being Falls Church at 2.05 sq mi (5.3 km^{2}; 1,310 acres). If the U.S. territories are included, the smallest county-equivalent is Kingman Reef, with a land area of 0.012 square miles (3.1 ha; 7.7 acres).

The following two tables exclude county-equivalents:

Largest counties by land area nationwide (excluding county-equivalents)
Rank	County	Land area (sq mi)	Land area (km^{2})
1	San Bernardino County, California	20,056.94	51,947.24
2	Coconino County, Arizona	18,618.89	48,222.70
3	Nye County, Nevada	18,181.92	47,090.96
4	Elko County, Nevada	17,169.83	44,469.66
5	Mohave County, Arizona	13,311.08	34,475.54
6	Apache County, Arizona	11,197.52	29,001.44
7	Lincoln County, Nevada	10,633.20	27,539.86
8	Sweetwater County, Wyoming	10,426.65	27,004.90
9	Inyo County, California	10,180.88	26,368.36
10	Harney County, Oregon	10,133.17	26,244.79

Smallest counties by land area nationwide (excluding county-equivalents)
Rank	County	Land area (sq mi)	Land area (km^{2})
1	Kalawao County, Hawaii	11.99	31.05
2	New York County, New York	22.83	59.13
3	Bristol County, Rhode Island	24.16	62.57
4	Arlington County, Virginia	25.97	67.26
5	Broomfield County, Colorado	33.03	85.55
6	Bronx County, New York	42.10	109.04
7	Nantucket County, Massachusetts	44.97	116.47
8	Hudson County, New Jersey	46.19	119.63
9	San Francisco County, California	46.87	121.39
10	Suffolk County, Massachusetts	58.15	150.61

The following two tables include county-equivalents: (Note: Note: the lists below rank locations by land area — the ranking would be different if they were ranked by total area.)

Largest counties by land area nationwide (including county-equivalents)
Rank	County	Land area (sq mi)	Land area (km^{2})
1	Yukon-Koyukuk Census Area, Alaska	145,899.69	377,868.5
2	North Slope Borough, Alaska	88.817.12	230,035.3
3	Bethel Census Area, Alaska	40.633.31	105,239.8
4	Northwest Arctic Borough, Alaska	35,898.34	92,976.3
5	Southeast Fairbanks Census Area, Alaska	24,814.86	64,270.2
6	Copper River Census Area, Alaska	24,692.00	63,951.98
7	Matanuska-Susitna Borough, Alaska	24,681.54	63,924.9
8	Lake and Peninsula Borough, Alaska	23,781.96	61,595.0
9	Nome Census Area, Alaska	23,000.91	59,572
10	San Bernardino County, California	20,052.5	51,936

Smallest counties by land area nationwide (including county-equivalents)
Rank	County	Land area (sq mi)	Land area (km^{2})
1	Kingman Reef, U.S. Minor Outlying Islands	0.01	0.03
2	Rose Atoll, American Samoa	0.1	0.3
3	Baker Island, U.S. Minor Outlying Islands	0.5	1.4
4	Howland Island, U.S. Minor Outlying Islands	0.6	1.6
5	Swains Island, American Samoa	1	2.6
6	Johnston Atoll, U.S. Minor Outlying Islands	1.1	2.8
7	Jarvis Island, U.S. Minor Outlying Islands	1.7	4.5
8	Navassa Island, U.S. Minor Outlying Islands	2.08	5.4
9	Independent City of Falls Church, Virginia	2.1	5.44
10	Midway Atoll, U.S. Minor Outlying Islands	2.4	6.2

Smallest counties by land area in the 50 states and District of Columbia (including county-equivalents)
Rank	County	Land area (sq mi)	Land area (km^{2})
1	Independent City of Falls Church, Virginia	2.1	5.4
2	Independent City of Lexington, Virginia	2.5	6.5
3	Independent City of Manassas Park, Virginia	2.5	6.5
4	Independent City of Covington, Virginia	4	10
5	Independent City of Fairfax, Virginia	6	16
6	Independent City of Buena Vista, Virginia	7	18
7	Independent City of Emporia, Virginia	7	18
8	Independent City of Norton, Virginia	7	18
9	Independent City of Colonial Heights, Virginia	8	21
10	Independent City of Franklin, Virginia	8	21
11	Independent City of Galax, Virginia	8	21

- Largest county or county-equivalent: Yukon-Koyukuk Census Area, Alaska
- Largest true county: San Bernardino County, California
- Smallest county or county-equivalent: Kingman Reef, U.S. Minor Outlying Islands
- Smallest county or county-equivalent in the 50 states: Independent City of Falls Church, Virginia
- Smallest true county: Kalawao County, Hawaii

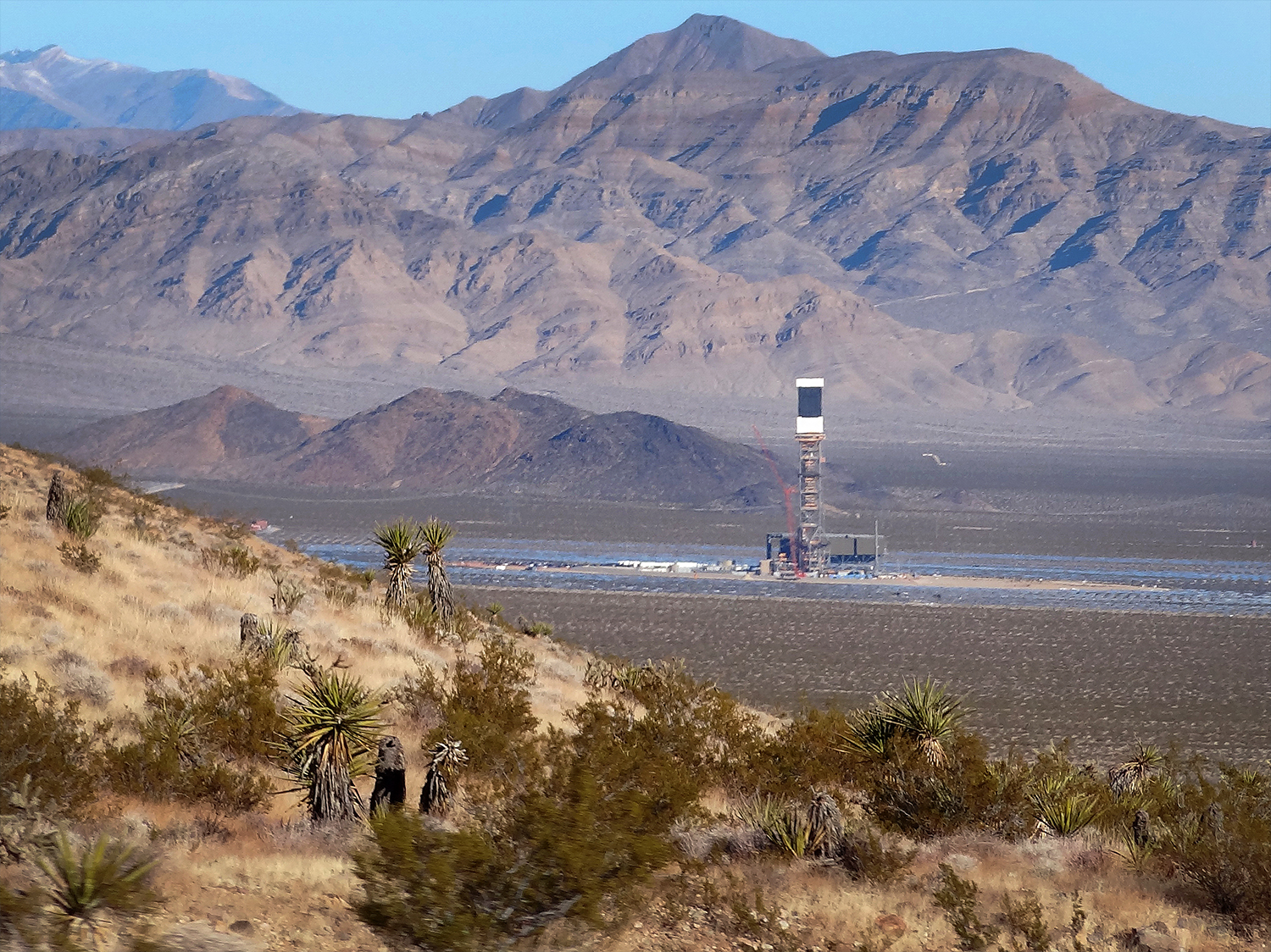
San Bernardino County, California, the largest county in the United States by land area (excluding county-equivalents)

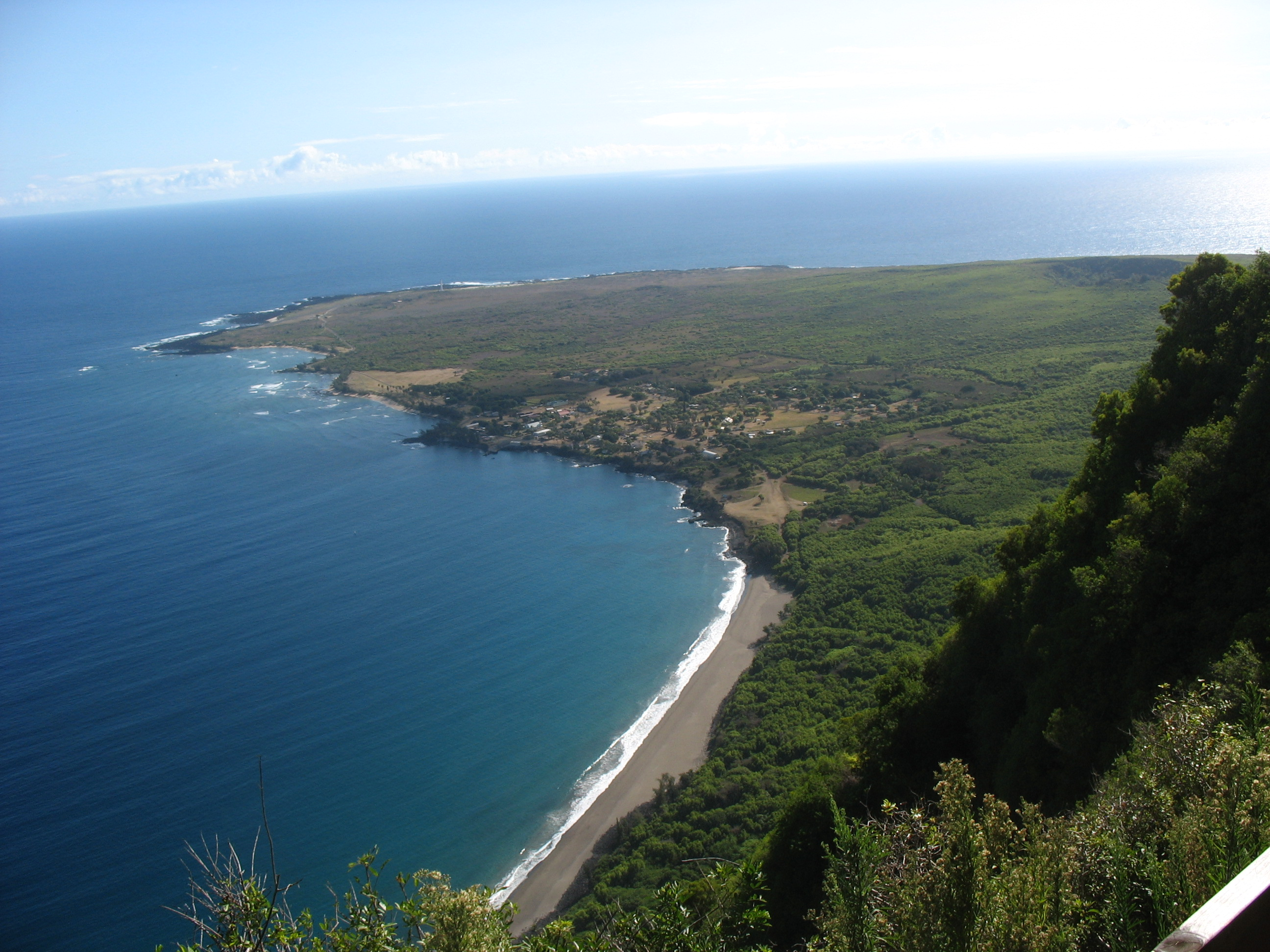
Kalawao County, Hawaii, the smallest county in the United States by land area (excluding county-equivalents)

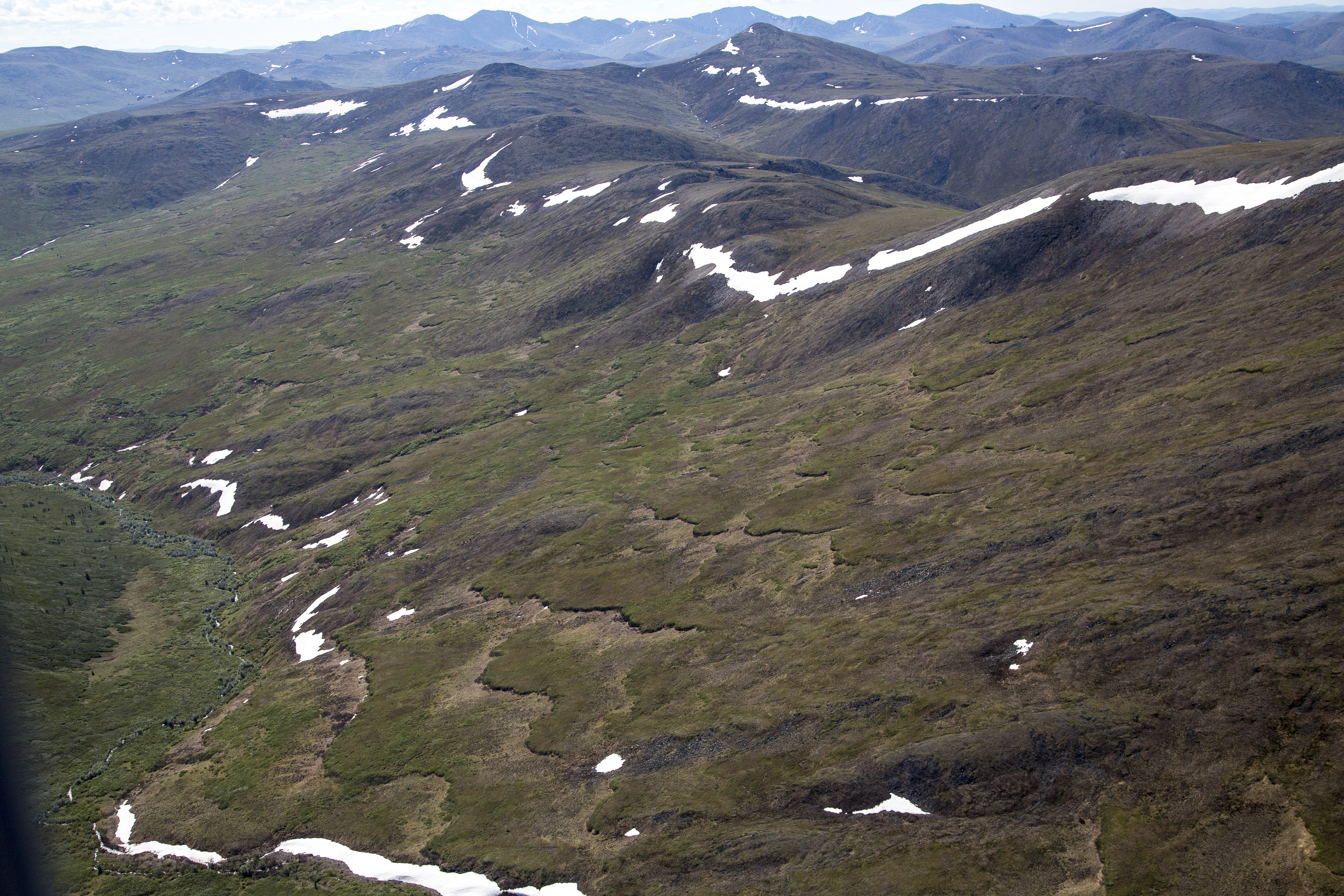
Yukon–Koyukuk Census Area, Alaska, the largest county or county-equivalent by land area in the United States

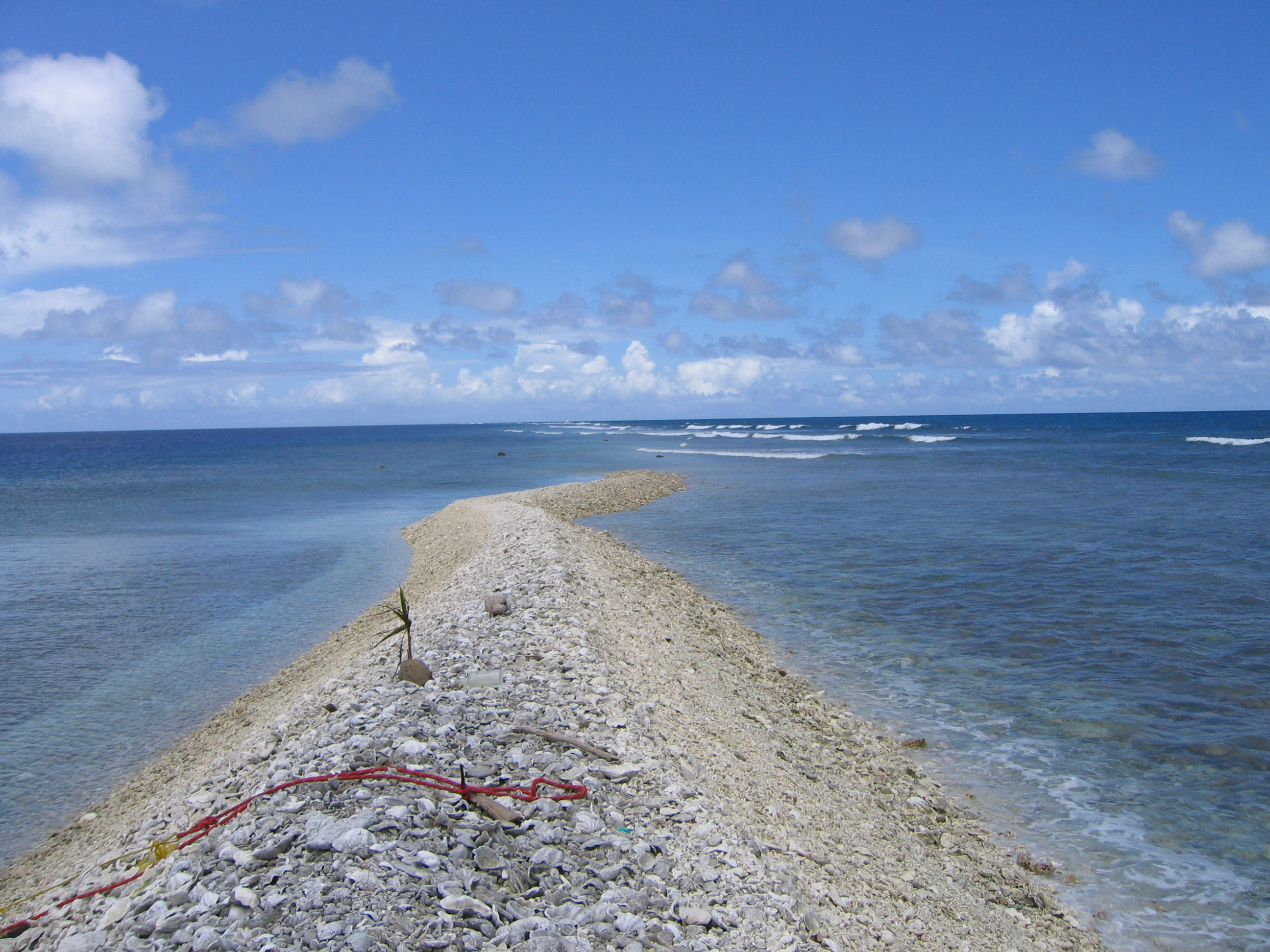
Kingman Reef, U.S. Minor Outlying Islands, the smallest county or county-equivalent by land area in the United States

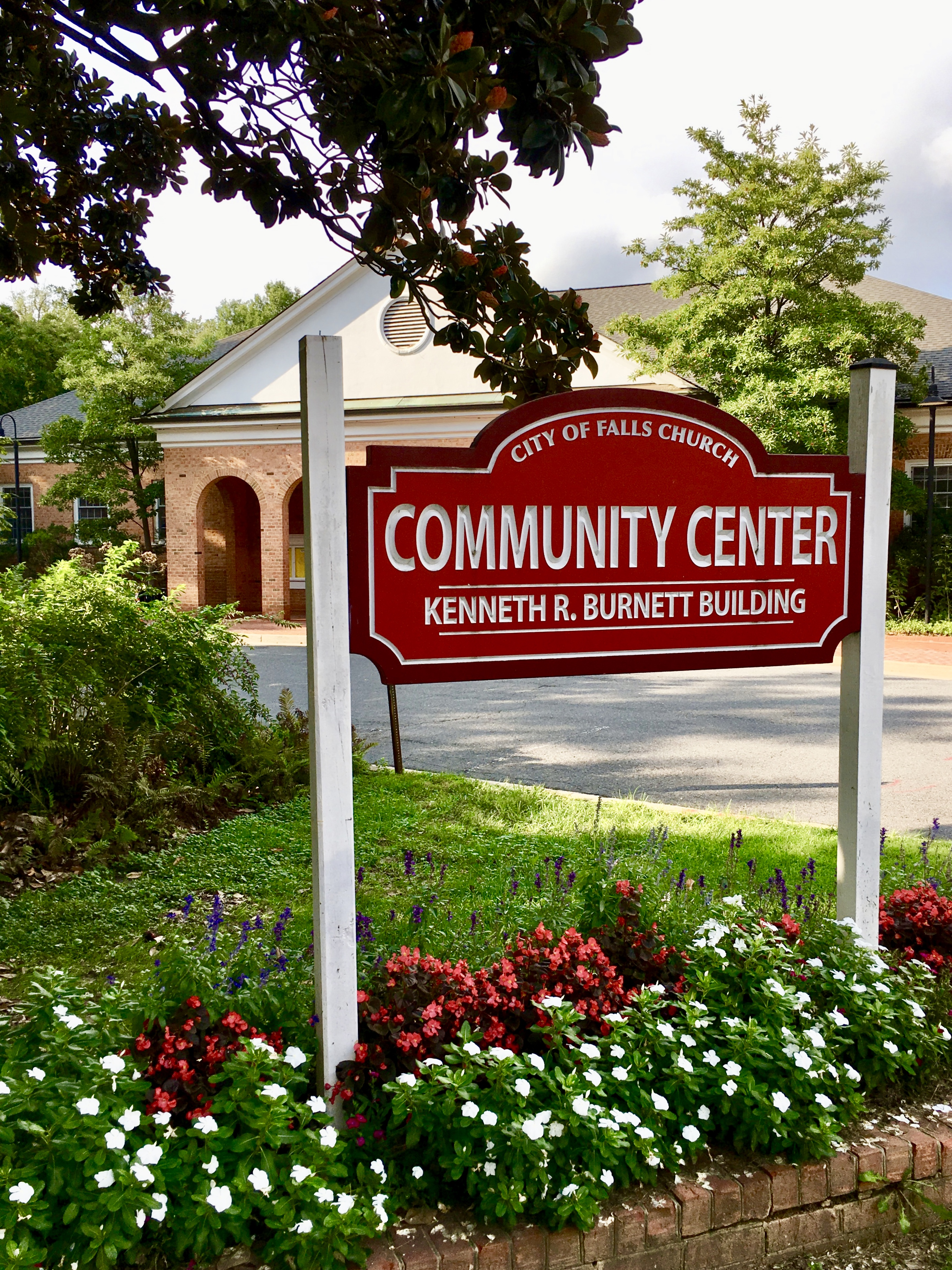
Falls Church, Virginia, the smallest county-equivalent in the 50 states by land area

=== Smallest, largest, and average area per state and territory ===
The following is a list of civil right appeal of jury appeal of judge counties and county-equivalents showing the average size of each state/territory's counties, the smallest county (or equivalent) in each state/territory, and the largest county (or equivalent) in each state/territory. States/territories on the list are arranged by the average land area of their counties. Though not on the list, the North Slope Borough is the largest independently incorporated county equivalent. The Unorganized Borough is substantially larger, but is an extension of the State of Alaska government and not independently incorporated.

Also note that the smallest land area with county-level governance in the U.S. is Falls Church, Virginia, but it is an independent city and not a county or part of one. Kingman Reef is the smallest county-equivalent in all U.S. territory (though it has no government). Kalawao County, Hawaii is the smallest true county by land area.

Smallest, largest and average land areas for counties and county-equivalents by state and territory
State federal district or territory	Avg. county land area, sq. mi. (km^{2})	Smallest county	Area, sq. mi. (km^{2})	Largest county	area, sq. mi. (km^{2})
The 50 states & D.C.	1,124.09 (2,911.4) (Note: If including water area, the average county size of counties and county-equivalents in the 50 states and D.C. is 1,208.38 square miles)	Independent City of Falls Church, Virginia	2.0 (5.2)	Yukon-Koyukuk Census Area, Alaska (Note: North Slope Borough, Alaska is the largest independently incorporated county-equivalent.)	145,505 (376,860)
The 50 states, D.C. & U.S. territories	1,090.69 (2,824.9) (Note: If including water area, the average county size of counties and county-equivalents in all U.S. territory is 1,172.38 square miles)	Kingman Reef, U.S. Minor Outlying Islands	0.01 (0.026)	Yukon-Koyukuk Census Area, Alaska	145,505 (376,860)
Alaska	8,545.7 (22,133)	Skagway Municipality	452.3 (1,171)	Yukon-Koyukuk Census Area	145,505 (376,860)
Arizona	7,572.9 (19,614)	Santa Cruz County	1,236.9 (3,204)	Coconino County	18,618.8 (48,222)
Nevada	6,457.7 (16,725)	City of Carson City	144.6 (375)	Nye County	18,181.9 (47,091)
Wyoming	4,221.4 (10,933)	Hot Springs County	2,004.0 (5,190)	Sweetwater County	10,426.6 (27,005)
New Mexico	3,675.7 (9,520)	Los Alamos County	109.1 (283)	Catron County	6,923.6 (17,932)
Utah	2,833.4 (7,338)	Davis County	298.7 (774)	San Juan County	7,819.9 (20,253)
California	2,685.8 (6,956)	San Francisco County	46.8 (121)	San Bernardino County	20,056.9 (51,947)
Oregon	2,666.3 (6,906)	Multnomah County	431.3 (1,117)	Harney County	10,133.1 (26,245)
Montana	2,599.0 (6,731)	Silver Bow County	718.4 (1,861)	Beaverhead County	5,541.6 (14,353)
Maine	1,927.7 (4,993)	Sagadahoc County	253.6 (657)	Aroostook County	6,671.3 (17,279)
Idaho	1,878.3 (4,865)	Payette County	406.8 (1,054)	Idaho County	8,477.3 (21,956)
Washington	1,704.0 (4,413)	San Juan County	173.9 (450)	Okanogan County	5,267.9 (13,644)
Colorado	1,619.4 (4,194)	Broomfield County	33.0 (85)	Las Animas County	4,772.6 (12,361)
North Dakota	1,301.9 (3,372)	Eddy County	630.1 (1,632)	McKenzie County	2,760.3 (7,149)
Hawaii	1,284.5 (3,327)	Kalawao County	11.9 (31)	Hawaii County	4,028.4 (10,434)
South Dakota	1,148.7 (2,975)	Clay County	412.1 (1,067)	Meade County	3,470.9 (8,990)
Texas	1,028.5 (2,664)	Rockwall County	127.0 (329)	Brewster County	6,183.7 (16,016)
Minnesota	915.2 (2,370)	Ramsey County	152.2 (394)	St. Louis County	6,247.4 (16,181)
New Hampshire	895.3 (2,319)	Strafford County	368.9 (955)	Coos County	1,794.6 (4,648)
Oklahoma	890.8 (2,307)	Marshall County	371.0 (961)	Osage County	2,246.3 (5,818)
Nebraska	826.1 (2,140)	Sarpy County	238.9 (619)	Cherry County	5,960.4 (15,437)
Florida	800.4 (2,073)	Union County	243.5 (631)	Collier County	1,998.3 (5,176)
Kansas	778.7 (2,017)	Wyandotte County	151.6 (393)	Butler County	1,429.8 (3,703)
Alabama	767.4 (1,988)	Etowah County	534.9 (1,385)	Baldwin County	1,589.7 (4,117)
New York	760.1 (1,969)	New York County	22.8 (59)	St. Lawrence County	2,680.3 (6,942)
Wisconsin	752.2 (1,948)	Pepin County	231.9 (601)	Marathon County	1,544.9 (4,001)
Arkansas	693.8 (1,797)	Lafayette County	528.2 (1,368)	Union County	1,039.2 (2,692)
Michigan	681.2 (1,764)	Benzie County	319.7 (828)	Marquette County	1,808.4 (4,684)
Louisiana	675.1 (1,749)	Orleans Parish	169.4 (439)	Vernon Parish	1,327.9 (3,439)
Pennsylvania	667.8 (1,730)	Montour County	130.2 (337)	Lycoming County	1,228.5 (3,182)
Vermont	658.3 (1,705)	Grand Isle County	81.8 (212)	Windsor County	969.3 (2,510)
South Carolina	653.5 (1,693)	McCormick County	359.1 (930)	Horry County	1,133.9 (2,937)
Delaware	649.5 (1,682)	New Castle County	426.2 (1,104)	Sussex County	936.0 (2,424)
Connecticut	605.3 (1,568)	Middlesex County	369.3 (956)	Litchfield County	920.5 (2,384)
Missouri	597.8 (1,548)	City of St. Louis	61.9 (160)	Texas County	1,177.2 (3,049)
Mississippi	572.2 (1,482)	Alcorn County	400.0 (1,036)	Yazoo County	922.9 (2,390)
Iowa	564.2 (1,461)	Dickinson County	380.6 (986)	Kossuth County	972.7 (2,519)
Massachusetts	557.1 (1,443)	Nantucket County	44.9 (116)	Worcester County	1,510.7 (3,913)
Illinois	544.3 (1,410)	Putnam County	160.1 (415)	McLean County	1,183.3 (3,065)
North Carolina	486.2 (1,259)	Chowan County	172.4 (447)	Robeson County	949.2 (2,458)
Ohio	464.3 (1,203)	Lake County	227.4 (589)	Ashtabula County	701.9 (1,818)
West Virginia	437.1 (1,132)	Hancock County	82.6 (214)	Randolph County	1,039.6 (2,693)
Tennessee	434.1 (1,124)	Trousdale County	114.1 (296)	Shelby County	763.1 (1,976)
Maryland	404.5 (1,048)	City of Baltimore	80.9 (210)	Frederick County	660.2 (1,710)
Indiana	389.4 (1,009)	Ohio County	86.1 (223)	Allen County	657.3 (1,702)
(Georgia (U.S. state)) Georgia	361.7 (937)	Clarke County	119.2 (309)	Ware County	892.4 (2,311)
New Jersey	350.2 (907)	Hudson County	46.1 (119)	Burlington County	798.5 (2,068)
Kentucky	329.1 (852)	Robertson County	99.9 (259)	Pike County	786.8 (2,038)
Virginia	294.7 (763)	Independent City of Falls Church	2.0 (5.2)	Pittsylvania County	968.9 (2,509)
Guam	210 (540)	Guam	210 (540)	Guam	210 (540)
Rhode Island	206.8 (536)	Bristol County	24.1 (62)	Providence County	409.5 (1,061)
District of Columbia	61.05 (158.1)	District of Columbia	61.05 (158.1)	District of Columbia	61.05 (158.1)
Puerto Rico	45.06 (116.7)	Cataño Municipality	4.84 (12.5)	Arecibo Municipality	125.95 (326.2)
Northern Mariana Islands	44.75 (115.9)	Rota Municipality	32.97 (85.4)	Northern Islands Municipality	59.75 (154.8)
U.S. Virgin Islands	44.57 (115.4)	Saint John	20 (52)	Saint Croix	84 (220)
American Samoa	15.4 (40)	Rose Atoll	0.083 (0.21)	Western District	28.87 (74.8)
(United States) U.S. Minor Outlying Islands	1.46 (3.8)	Kingman Reef	0.01 (0.026)	Palmyra Atoll	4.59 (11.9)

== Population density ==
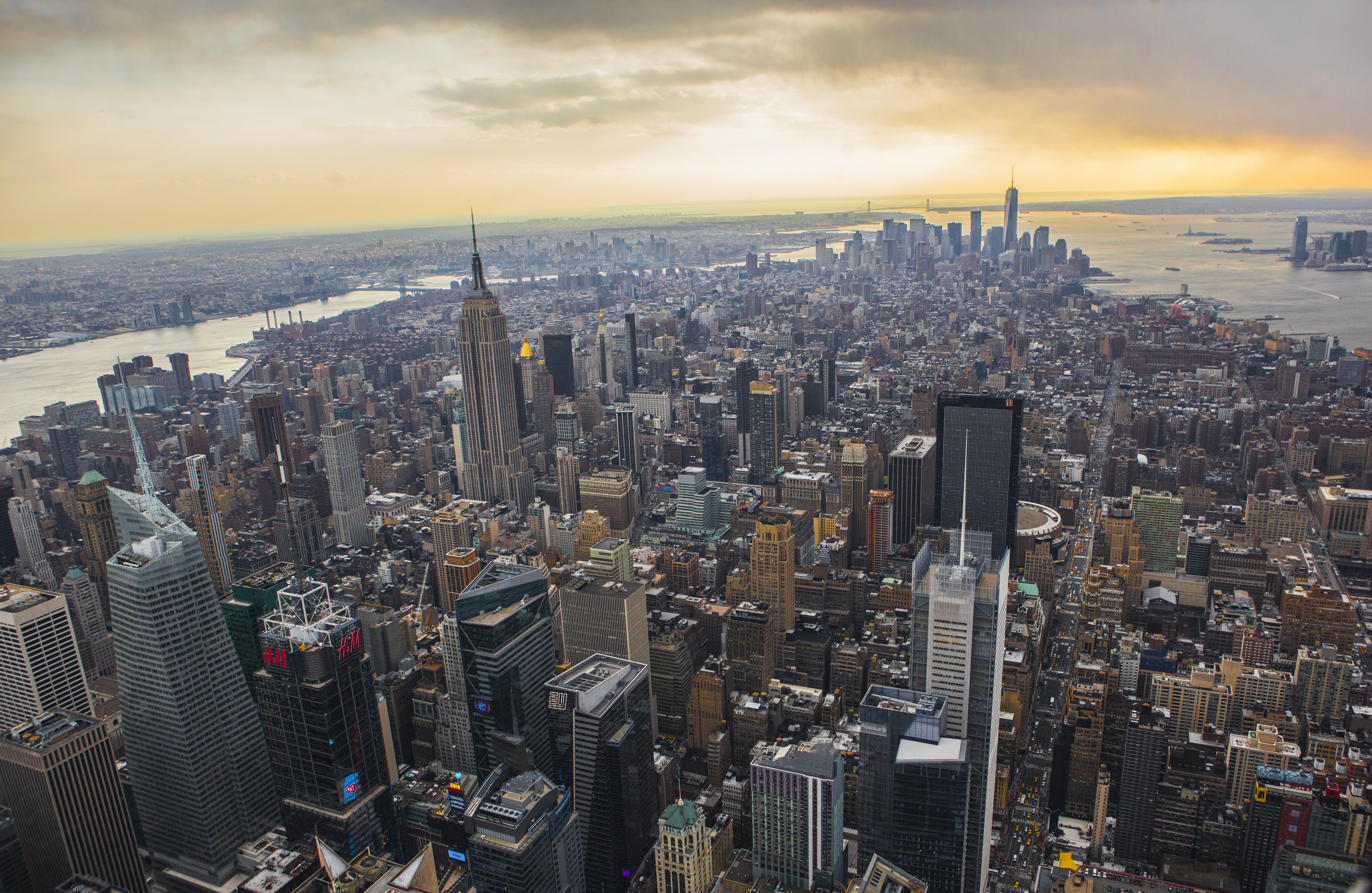
New York County, New York (Manhattan), the most densely populated county in the United States. At the top and top-left (beyond the East River) is Kings County (Brooklyn), the second-most densely populated county in the United States.

=== Most densely populated ===
Data presented below is based on U.S. Census department data from 2010. Calculations are made by dividing the population by the land area. All county equivalents are included. This list includes the 50 most densely populated counties and county-equivalents in the 50 states and District of Columbia, plus the 9 highest-density municipalities (county-equivalents) of Puerto Rico. Puerto Rico is the only U.S. territory with population densities (of county-equivalents) high enough to be on this list. Note that many of these high-density counties are coterminous with large cities (for example San Francisco and Philadelphia) or are independent cities in Virginia (as well as Baltimore and St. Louis) which are considered county-equivalents.

Rank	County name	Principal cities	Pop/sq mi	Pop/km^{2}
1	New York County, New York	Manhattan, New York City	69,468	26,822
2	Kings County, New York	Brooklyn, New York City	35,369	13,656
3	Bronx County, New York	The Bronx, New York City	32,903	12,704
4	Queens County, New York	Queens, New York City	20,554	7,936
5	City and County of San Francisco, California	San Francisco	17,179	6,633
6	Hudson County, New Jersey	Jersey City, Union City	13,732	5,302
7	Suffolk County, Massachusetts	Boston	12,417	4,794
8	Philadelphia County, Pennsylvania	Philadelphia	11,379	4,394
9	Washington, District of Columbia		9,857	3,806
10	Alexandria, Virginia		9,314	3,596
11	Arlington County, Virginia	Arlington	8,853	3,520
12	San Juan Municipality, Puerto Rico		8,262	3,190
13	Richmond County, New York	Staten Island, New York City	8,030	3,101
14	Baltimore City, Maryland		7,672	2,962
15	Essex County, New Jersey	Newark	6,212	2,398
16	Falls Church, Virginia		6,170	2,382
17	Cataño Municipality, Puerto Rico		5,809	2,243
18	Manassas Park, Virginia		5,633	2,175
19	Cook County, Illinois	Chicago	5,495	2,122
20	Union County, New Jersey	Elizabeth	5,216	2,014
21	City of Saint Louis, Missouri		5,157	1,991
22	Nassau County, New York	Hempstead, western Long Island	4,705	1,817
23	Bayamón Municipality, Puerto Rico		4,695	1,813
24	Norfolk, Virginia		4,486	1,732
25	Charlottesville, Virginia		4,242	1,638
26	Milwaukee County, Wisconsin	Milwaukee	3,926	1,516
27	Denver County, Colorado	Denver	3,923	1,515
28	Carolina Municipality, Puerto Rico		3,900	1,506
29	Bergen County, New Jersey	Hackensack	3,884	1,500
30	Toa Baja Municipality, Puerto Rico		3,856	1,489
31	Manassas, Virginia		3,828	1,478
32	Orange County, California	Anaheim, Santa Ana, Irvine	3,808	1,470
33	Fairfax City, Virginia		3,617	1,396
34	Trujillo Alto Municipality, Puerto Rico		3,604	1,392
35	Guaynabo Municipality, Puerto Rico		3,551	1,371
36	Richmond, Virginia		3,415	1,318
37	Pinellas County, Florida	St. Petersburg	3,348	1,292
38	Ramsey County, Minnesota	St. Paul	3,342	1,290
39	Delaware County, Pennsylvania	Southwest Philadelphia suburbs	3,039	1,173
40	Wayne County, Michigan	Detroit	2,974	1,148
41	Portsmouth, Virginia		2,839	1,096
42	Winchester, Virginia		2,838	1,096
43	Lexington, Virginia		2,820	1,089
44	Harrisonburg, Virginia		2,808	1,084
45	Cuyahoga County, Ohio	Cleveland	2,800	1,081
46	DuPage County, Illinois	Western Chicago suburbs	2,800	1,081
47	Fairfax County, Virginia	Washington, D.C. suburbs	2,767	1,068
48	Toa Alta Municipality, Puerto Rico		2,742	1,058
49	Dallas County, Texas	Dallas	2,718	1,049
50	Passaic County, New Jersey	Paterson	2,715	1,048
51	Hampton, Virginia		2,674	1,032
52	Newport News, Virginia		2,634	1,017
53	Middlesex County, New Jersey	New Brunswick, Edison	2,622	1,012
54	DeKalb County, Georgia	Atlanta suburbs and small part of Atlanta	2,586	998
55	Caguas Municipality, Puerto Rico		2,439	942
56	Los Angeles County, California	Los Angeles	2,420	934
57	Harris County, Texas	Houston	2,402	928
58	Fredericksburg, Virginia		2,326	898
59	Camden County, New Jersey	Camden	2,322	896

=== Least densely populated ===
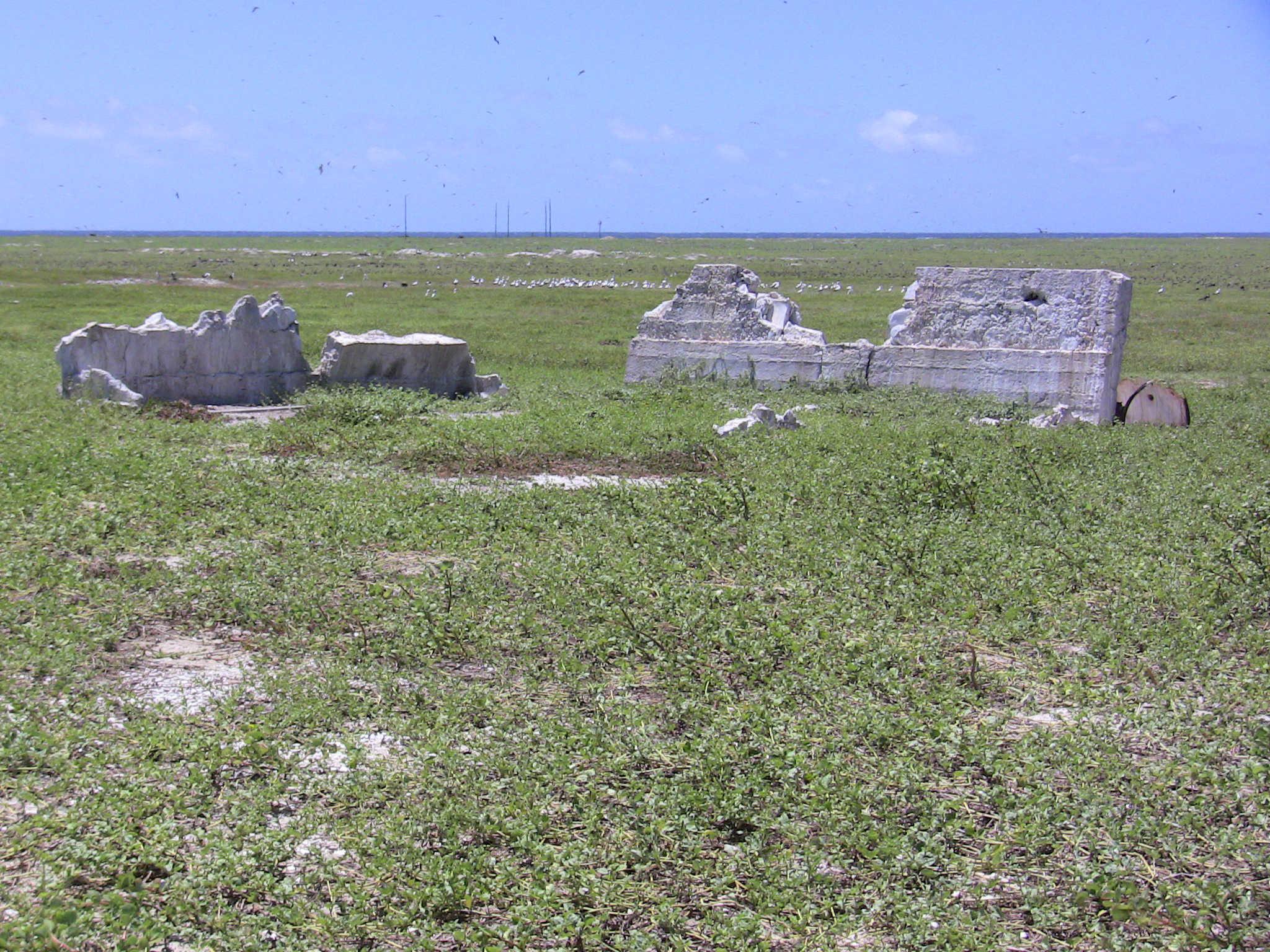
Baker Island, U.S. Minor Outlying Islands — one of the 8 county-equivalents with zero people

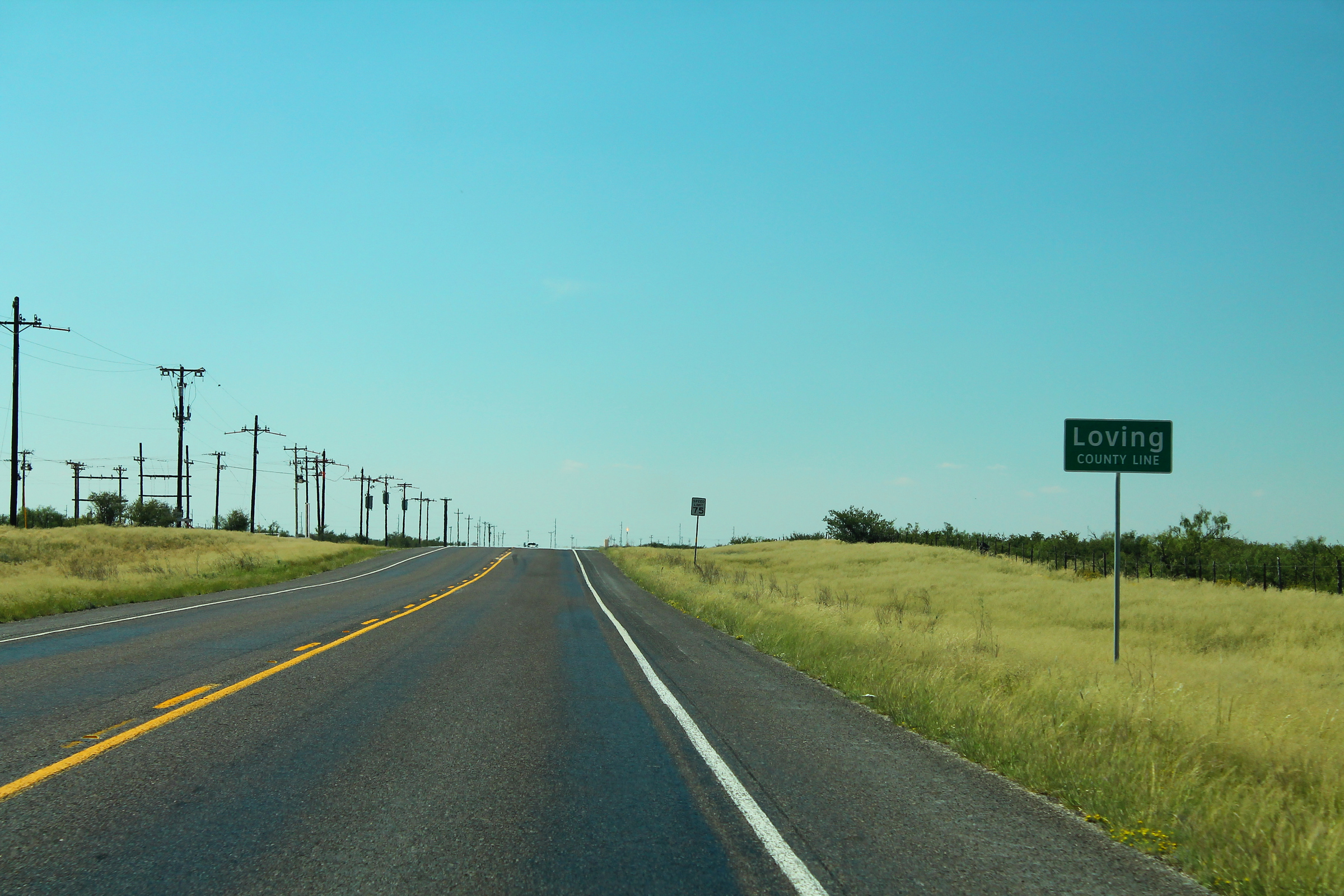
Loving County, Texas has an area of 680 sq mi (1,800 km^{2}; 440,000 acres) and is inhabited by about 52 people.

This list was generated by dividing the population by the land area. All county equivalents are included. The list is dominated by just a few states: Alaska, Montana, and Texas together comprise about two-thirds of the entries. The Unorganized Borough is not included here as a unit, but its census areas (non-governmental entities) are. If the census areas were removed from the list, the Unorganized Borough would rank fourteenth with a density of 0.38 per square mile (0.15/km^{2}).

The 8 uninhabited county-equivalents in the U.S. territories are listed at the top of the table — these are technically the least-densely populated counties/county-equivalents in the United States, but since they have no people, they are listed unranked.

Counties with lowest population densities
Rank	County name	Pop/sq mi	Pop/km^{2}
—	Baker Island, U.S. Minor Outlying Islands	0	0
—	Howland Island, U.S. Minor Outlying Islands	0	0
—	Jarvis Island, U.S. Minor Outlying Islands	0	0
—	Johnston Atoll, U.S. Minor Outlying Islands	0	0
—	Kingman Reef, U.S. Minor Outlying Islands	0	0
—	Navassa Island, U.S. Minor Outlying Islands	0	0
—	Northern Islands Municipality, Northern Mariana Islands	0	0
—	Rose Atoll, American Samoa	0	0
1	Yukon–Koyukuk Census Area, Alaska	0.03	0.01
2	Lake and Peninsula Borough, Alaska	0.06	0.02
3	Yakutat Borough, Alaska	0.08	0.03
4	North Slope Borough, Alaska	0.10	0.04
5	Loving County, Texas	0.12	0.04
6	Denali Borough, Alaska	0.14	0.05
7	Northwest Arctic Borough, Alaska	0.21	0.08
8	Esmeralda County, Nevada	0.21	0.08
9	Garfield County, Montana	0.25	0.10
10	Dillingham Census Area, Alaska	0.26	0.10
11	Valdez-Cordova Census Area, Alaska	0.28	0.10
12	Southeast Fairbanks Census Area, Alaska	0.28	0.11
13	Kenedy County, Texas	0.28	0.11
14	Hoonah-Angoon Census Area, Alaska	0.28	0.11
15	Petroleum County, Montana	0.29	0.11
16	King County, Texas	0.31	0.12
17	Harding County, New Mexico	0.32	0.12
18	Carter County, Montana	0.34	0.13
19	Nome Census Area, Alaska	0.41	0.16
20	Terrell County, Texas	0.41	0.16
21	Bethel Census Area, Alaska	0.41	0.16
22	Kusilvak Census Area, Alaska	0.43	0.16
23	Aleutians East Borough, Alaska	0.45	0.17
24	Harding County, South Dakota	0.47	0.18
25	Eureka County, Nevada	0.47	0.18
26	Lincoln County, Nevada	0.50	0.19
27	Powder River County, Montana	0.52	0.20
28	Catron County, New Mexico	0.53	0.20
29	Clark County, Idaho	0.55	0.21
30	Slope County, North Dakota	0.59	0.23
31	McMullen County, Texas	0.62	0.24
32	McPherson County, Nebraska	0.62	0.24
33	Culberson County, Texas	0.62	0.24
34	Sioux County, Nebraska	0.63	0.24
35	Arthur County, Nebraska	0.64	0.24
36	McCone County, Montana	0.65	0.25
37	Blaine County, Nebraska	0.67	0.26
38	Prairie County, Montana	0.67	0.26
39	Billings County, North Dakota	0.68	0.26
40	Borden County, Texas	0.71	0.27
41	Harney County, Oregon	0.73	0.28
42	Treasure County, Montana	0.73	0.28
43	Golden Valley County, Montana	0.75	0.29
44	Hinsdale County, Colorado	0.75	0.29
45	Hudspeth County, Texas	0.76	0.29
46	Meagher County, Montana	0.79	0.30
47	Kiowa County, Colorado	0.79	0.30
48	Grant County, Nebraska	0.79	0.30
49	Mineral County, Colorado	0.81	0.31
50	Phillips County, Montana	0.82	0.31

=== Population density per state and territory ===
Data presented below is based on U.S. Census Bureau data from 2010. Calculations are made by dividing the population by the land area. All county equivalents are included.

Excluding the census areas of Alaska, Lake and Peninsula Borough is the least densely populated county equivalent with 0.069/sq mi (0.027/km^{2}).

The District of Columbia and Guam each only have one county-equivalent, so their most/least densely populated county is the same.

State federal district or territory	Least densely populated county	Population density	Most densely populated county	Population density
Alabama	Wilcox County	13.13/sq mi (5.07/km^{2})	Jefferson County	592.53/sq mi (228.78/km^{2})
Alaska	Yukon-Koyukuk Census Area	0.03/sq mi (0.012/km^{2})	Anchorage Municipality	171.19/sq mi (66.10/km^{2})
American Samoa	Rose Atoll (Note: The least-densely populated inhabited county-equivalent in American Samoa is Swains Island, which has 18.1 people per square mile.)	0.00/sq mi (0/km^{2})	Western District	1,139.00/sq mi (439.77/km^{2})
Arizona	La Paz County	4.55/sq mi (1.76/km^{2})	Maricopa County	414.89/sq mi (160.19/km^{2})
Arkansas	Calhoun County	8.53/sq mi (3.29/km^{2})	Pulaski County	503.77/sq mi (194.51/km^{2})
California	Alpine County	1.59/sq mi (0.61/km^{2})	San Francisco County	17,179.15/sq mi (6,632.91/km^{2})
Colorado	Hinsdale County	0.75/sq mi (0.29/km^{2})	Denver County	3,922.59/sq mi (1,514.52/km^{2})
Connecticut	Litchfield County	206.31/sq mi (79.66/km^{2})	Fairfield County	1,467.18/sq mi (566.48/km^{2})
Delaware	Sussex County	210.60/sq mi (81.31/km^{2})	New Castle County	1,263.18/sq mi (487.72/km^{2})
District of Columbia	District of Columbia	9,857.20/sq mi (3,805.89/km^{2})	District of Columbia	9,857.20/sq mi (3,805.89/km^{2})
Florida	Liberty County	10.01/sq mi (3.86/km^{2})	Pinellas County	3,347.50/sq mi (1,292.48/km^{2})
(Georgia (U.S. state)) Georgia	Clinch County	8.49/sq mi (3.28/km^{2})	DeKalb County	2,585.72/sq mi (998.35/km^{2})
Guam	Guam	759.60/sq mi (293.28/km^{2})	Guam	759.60/sq mi (293.28/km^{2})
Hawaii	Kalawao County	7.50/sq mi (2.90/km^{2})	Honolulu County	1,586.71/sq mi (612.63/km^{2})
Idaho	Clark County	0.55/sq mi (0.21/km^{2})	Ada County	372.76/sq mi (143.92/km^{2})
Illinois	Pope County	12.12/sq mi (4.68/km^{2})	Cook County	5,495.11/sq mi (2,121.67/km^{2})
Indiana	Benton County	21.78/sq mi (8.41/km^{2})	Marion County	2,279.57/sq mi (880.15/km^{2})
Iowa	Adams County	9.51/sq mi (3.67/km^{2})	Polk County	750.51/sq mi (289.77/km^{2})
Kansas	Greeley County	1.60/sq mi (0.62/km^{2})	Johnson County	1,149.57/sq mi (443.85/km^{2})
Kentucky	Hickman County	20.23/sq mi (7.81/km^{2})	Jefferson County	1,948.11/sq mi (752.17/km^{2})
Louisiana	Cameron Parish	5.32/sq mi (2.05/km^{2})	Orleans Parish	2,029.41/sq mi (783.56/km^{2})
Maine	Piscataquis County	4.42/sq mi (1.71/km^{2})	Cumberland County	337.23/sq mi (130.21/km^{2})
Maryland	Garrett County	46.51/sq mi (17.96/km^{2})	City of Baltimore	7,671.51/sq mi (2,961.99/km^{2})
Massachusetts	Franklin County	102.05/sq mi (39.40/km^{2})	Suffolk County	12,416.78/sq mi (4,794.15/km^{2})
Michigan	Keweenaw County	3.99/sq mi (1.54/km^{2})	Wayne County	2,974.42/sq mi (1,148.43/km^{2})
Minnesota	Lake of the Woods County	3.11/sq mi (1.20/km^{2})	Ramsey County	3,341.64/sq mi (1,290.21/km^{2})
Mississippi	Issaquena County	3.40/sq mi (1.31/km^{2})	DeSoto County	338.66/sq mi (130.76/km^{2})
Missouri	Worth County	8.14/sq mi (3.14/km^{2})	City of St. Louis	5,157.48/sq mi (1,991.31/km^{2})
Montana	Garfield County	0.25/sq mi (0.097/km^{2})	Yellowstone County	56.19/sq mi (21.70/km^{2})
Nebraska	McPherson County	0.63/sq mi (0.24/km^{2})	Douglas County	1,574.37/sq mi (607.87/km^{2})
Nevada	Esmeralda County	0.21/sq mi (0.081/km^{2})	Carson City	382.09/sq mi (147.53/km^{2})
New Hampshire	Coos County	18.41/sq mi (7.11/km^{2})	Hillsborough County	457.37/sq mi (176.59/km^{2})
New Jersey	Salem County	199.10/sq mi (76.87/km^{2})	Hudson County	13,731.61/sq mi (5,301.80/km^{2})
New Mexico	Harding County	0.32/sq mi (0.12/km^{2})	Bernalillo County	570.76/sq mi (220.37/km^{2})
New York	Hamilton County	2.81/sq mi (1.08/km^{2})	New York County	69,468.42/sq mi (26,821.91/km^{2})
North Carolina	Hyde County	9.48/sq mi (3.66/km^{2})	Mecklenburg County	1,755.54/sq mi (677.82/km^{2})
North Dakota	Billings County	0.68/sq mi (0.26/km^{2})	Cass County	84.86/sq mi (32.76/km^{2})
Northern Mariana Islands	Northern Islands Municipality (Note: The least-densely populated inhabited county-equivalent in the Northern Mariana Islands is Tinian Municipality, which has 75.0 people per square mile.)	0.00/sq mi (0/km^{2})	Saipan Municipality	1,050.80/sq mi (405.72/km^{2})
Ohio	Monroe County	32.12/sq mi (12.40/km^{2})	Cuyahoga County	2,799.95/sq mi (1,081.07/km^{2})
Oklahoma	Cimarron County	1.34/sq mi (0.52/km^{2})	Tulsa County	1,058.14/sq mi (408.55/km^{2})
Oregon	Harney County	0.73/sq mi (0.28/km^{2})	Multnomah County	1,704.93/sq mi (658.28/km^{2})
Pennsylvania	Cameron County	12.83/sq mi (4.95/km^{2})	Philadelphia County	11,379.49/sq mi (4,393.65/km^{2})
Puerto Rico	Culebra Municipality	156.40/sq mi (60.39/km^{2})	San Juan Municipality	8,262.30/sq mi (3,190.09/km^{2})
Rhode Island	Washington County	385.67/sq mi (148.91/km^{2})	Bristol County	2,064.00/sq mi (796.91/km^{2})
South Carolina	Allendale County	25.53/sq mi (9.86/km^{2})	Greenville County	574.72/sq mi (221.90/km^{2})
South Dakota	Harding County	0.47/sq mi (0.18/km^{2})	Minnehaha County	209.95/sq mi (81.06/km^{2})
Tennessee	Perry County	19.08/sq mi (7.37/km^{2})	Davidson County	1,243.33/sq mi (480.05/km^{2})
Texas	Loving County	0.12/sq mi (0.046/km^{2})	Dallas County	2,718.00/sq mi (1,049.43/km^{2})
(United States) U.S. Minor Outlying Islands	6 entities (Note: The 6 county-equivalents in the U.S. Minor Outlying Islands with zero people are Baker Island, Howland Island, Jarvis Island, Johnston Atoll, Kingman Reef and Navassa Island. The least-densely populated entity with a human population is Palmyra Atoll, which has 4.3 people per square mile.)	0.00/sq mi (0/km^{2})	Wake Island	39.80/sq mi (15.37/km^{2})
Utah	Garfield County	0.99/sq mi (0.38/km^{2})	Salt Lake County	1,387.14/sq mi (535.58/km^{2})
Vermont	Essex County	9.50/sq mi (3.67/km^{2})	Chittenden County	291.74/sq mi (112.64/km^{2})
(United States Virgin Islands) Virgin Islands (U.S.)	Saint John Island	211.80/sq mi (81.78/km^{2})	Saint Thomas Island	1,649.10/sq mi (636.72/km^{2})
Virginia	Highland County	5.59/sq mi (2.16/km^{2})	Alexandria City	9,314.30/sq mi (3,596.27/km^{2})
Washington	Garfield County	3.18/sq mi (1.23/km^{2})	King County	912.87/sq mi (352.46/km^{2})
West Virginia	Pocahontas County	9.27/sq mi (3.58/km^{2})	Ohio County	419.98/sq mi (162.16/km^{2})
Wisconsin	Iron County	7.80/sq mi (3.01/km^{2})	Milwaukee County	3,925.95/sq mi (1,515.82/km^{2})
Wyoming	Niobrara County	0.94/sq mi (0.36/km^{2})	Laramie County	34.15/sq mi (13.19/km^{2})

== See also ==
- Local government in the United States

== Notes ==
A: The Unorganized Borough, Alaska, formed by the Borough Act of 1961, is a legal entity, run by the Alaska state government as an extension of State government, it and the independently incorporated Unified, Home Rule, First Class and Second Class boroughs roughly correspond to parishes in Louisiana and to counties in the other 48 states.
