= Cat Creek Oil Field =

Oil field near Cat Creek, Montana, US

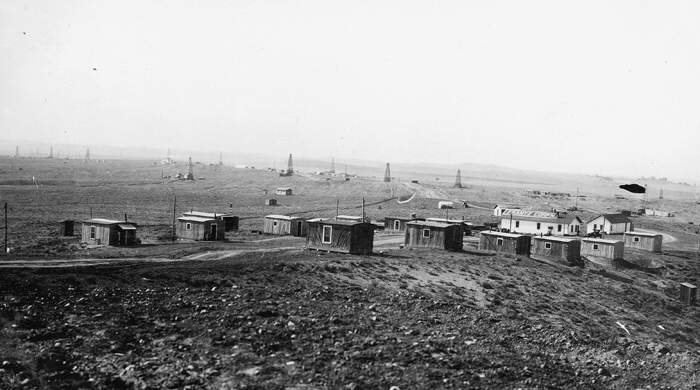
Cat Creek Oil Field (1921)

The Cat Creek Oil Field is located near the community of Cat Creek in Petroleum and Garfield counties in the U.S. state of Montana. The geological terminology used by Bowen, the geologist, to define the geological structure of Cat Creek in 1914 was Cat Creek Anticline. Peak of production recorded in 1922, with 11 wells drilling was 3 million barrels of oil.

== History ==
Cat Creek obtains its name from an "early cowboy who reportedly roped a mountain lion along the creek that flows into the Musselshell River." Oil was discovered at Cat Creek to the northwest of Mosby in 1919.

The geologist defined the boundary of the many anticlines that extended from Judith Mountains to the east and the Porcupine Dome. This area now encompasses Box Elder, Kootenai, Brush Creek and Oiltans. In the geological map that he prepared for the area, sandstone formation was depicted in the shape of a "V". The outcrop aligned in an eastern direction extended in to the town. In subsequent detailed study of the area carried out in 1919 and 1920, the outcrop was narrowed down to a confined area and also mapped by Charles T. Lupton of Denver, Colorado, Wallace Lee and L.R. Van Burg. This formed the basis for all future work.

Petroleum find from the area was visualized and Lupton established the Frantz Corporation and obtained lease rights for the entire stretch of the anticline which he and his associates had mapped. Events of petroleum extraction in the nearby areas (such as Black oil in the Devil's Basin) strengthened their resolve to proceed further with drilling operations in the area of the anticline, now known as Mosby Dome. On 18 February 1920 at the southeast corner of the county, the first drill test at Cat Creek was carried out. The discovery well was drilled by the Frantz Oil Corp but the success of oil find was limited in this first effort. In the second effort undertaken at West Dome, initial yield was 350 barrels daily up to August 1920. Then the drill hole was cleaned up which resulted in increased oil production of 2000 barrels per day. Encouraged by this success 300 more drill holes were done in the next 6 years.

Apart from the anticline, the first Cat Creek Sand area also produced substantial oil from 131 wells. This first oil field was called the "First Cat Creek sand" and it produced the majority of the oil at the site, and was the largest with an average of 40 feet (12 m). This was followed by exploration in second Sand Creek Area which produced oil from 60 wells. The fracture shale zone and the silty sandstone (above the Kootenai) were also exploited. However, the overall picture was a record maximum production from the West Dome Area.

A pipeline was constructed from Cat Creek Oil Field and became a major source of employment in a sparsely populated county. Petroleum found in the Cat Creek was of high grade. Cat Creek Oil Field reached its peak of production in 1922, with 11 wells drilling 3 million barrels of oil.

In the 1930s, the Continental Oil Company (CONOCO) had assumed control of the oil fields, and the industry thrived in the 1940s in particular once again. A pilot water-flood project occurred at West dome in 1957. A third field is known as the East Dome. The sandstone at the third field at Cat Creek was known by the drillers as the "Third Cat Creek sand". By the early 1960s activity at Cat Creek had declined.

As a result of the discovery of the Cat Creek Oil Field, the Montana state government established Petroleum County in 1925, splitting it from Fergus County with Winnett as its capital. It was named after the emerging petroleum industry of Cat Creek.

== Location ==
There are two major areas in the oil fields:

- Mosby Dome Cat Creek Oil Field: 47°03′00″N 107°55′18″W
- West Dome Cat Creek Oil Field: 47°04′02″N 107°59′50″W

== See also ==
- List of oil fields of Montana

== Bibliography ==
- Lindahl, John A. (1993). Soil survey. U.S. Dept. of Agriculture Soil Conservation Service.
