= Flatwillow, Montana =

Flatwillow
- Unincorporated community
- Location within the state of Montana
- Coordinates: 46°49′55″N 108°24′0″W
- Country: United States
- State: Montana
- County: Petroleum
- Elevation: 3,225 ft (983 m)
- Time zone: UTC-7 (Mountain (MST))
  - Summer (DST): UTC-6 (MDT)
- GNIS feature ID: 771461

Flatwillow (also Flatwillow Crossing) is a former unincorporated town in southern Petroleum County, Montana, United States. All buildings of the town are now gone, and the land is now privately owned farmland.

== History ==
Flatwillow lay along local roads south of the town of Winnett, the county seat of Petroleum County. at an elevation of 3,225 feet (983 m). Flatwillow's post office first opened on March 27, 1883 and closed on April 15, 1907, only to be reopened on August 1, 1908. The post office was again closed on April 30, 1946.

== Climate ==
Flatwillow has a cold semi-arid climate (BSk). Winter is cold, dry and variable. It can alternate between periods of extreme cold and milder stretches with days well above freezing. Lows fall below 0 °F (−18 °C) on 19.3 days per year. Spring comes quickly in March, but snow can still occur as late as May. This is the wettest time of year with frequent showers and thunderstorms. Summer is hot and dry with chilly nights. High temperatures of at least 90 °F (32 °C) occur on an average of 35.3 days per year and 100 °F (38 °C) on 3. However, there is still a decent amount of cool days and nights are pleasantly cool. Fall comes rapidly with snow possible in September.

The freeze-free season ranges from May 23 to September 21. The coldest temperature recorded is −48 °F (−44 °C) on December 18, 1924, while the record high is 108 °F (42 °C) on August 6, 1949, July 19, 1960, August 5, 1961, and July 22, 1963. The most snow recorded in one water year is 110.5 inches (281 cm) in 2017–2018. The least snow recorded in a water year is 7.0 inches (18 cm) in 2009–2010.

Climate data for Flatwillow, Montana, 1991–2020 normals, extremes 1913–present
Month	Jan	Feb	Mar	Apr	May	Jun	Jul	Aug	Sep	Oct	Nov	Dec	Year
Record high °F (°C)	72 (22)	76 (24)	80 (27)	91 (33)	98 (37)	107 (42)	108 (42)	108 (42)	104 (40)	94 (34)	81 (27)	70 (21)	108 (42)
Mean maximum °F (°C)	58.8 (14.9)	61.9 (16.6)	71.1 (21.7)	79.7 (26.5)	86.0 (30.0)	93.7 (34.3)	99.3 (37.4)	99.0 (37.2)	94.4 (34.7)	84.1 (28.9)	69.8 (21.0)	59.1 (15.1)	101.1 (38.4)
Mean daily maximum °F (°C)	35.5 (1.9)	38.3 (3.5)	48.4 (9.1)	58.0 (14.4)	67.0 (19.4)	75.7 (24.3)	85.8 (29.9)	85.6 (29.8)	74.6 (23.7)	59.7 (15.4)	46.1 (7.8)	37.0 (2.8)	59.3 (15.2)
Daily mean °F (°C)	25.0 (−3.9)	27.2 (−2.7)	36.3 (2.4)	44.8 (7.1)	53.9 (12.2)	62.7 (17.1)	70.4 (21.3)	69.6 (20.9)	59.8 (15.4)	47.2 (8.4)	35.0 (1.7)	26.2 (−3.2)	46.5 (8.1)
Mean daily minimum °F (°C)	14.4 (−9.8)	16.0 (−8.9)	24.3 (−4.3)	31.6 (−0.2)	40.8 (4.9)	49.6 (9.8)	55.1 (12.8)	53.6 (12.0)	44.9 (7.2)	34.7 (1.5)	23.9 (−4.5)	15.5 (−9.2)	33.7 (0.9)
Mean minimum °F (°C)	−15.7 (−26.5)	−10.0 (−23.3)	0.9 (−17.3)	15.0 (−9.4)	25.0 (−3.9)	36.0 (2.2)	43.0 (6.1)	40.7 (4.8)	28.9 (−1.7)	13.8 (−10.1)	−2.5 (−19.2)	−11.0 (−23.9)	−23.8 (−31.0)
Record low °F (°C)	−42 (−41)	−46 (−43)	−30 (−34)	−14 (−26)	8 (−13)	27 (−3)	34 (1)	30 (−1)	8 (−13)	−18 (−28)	−29 (−34)	−48 (−44)	−48 (−44)
Average precipitation inches (mm)	0.48 (12)	0.45 (11)	0.58 (15)	1.41 (36)	2.83 (72)	2.72 (69)	1.27 (32)	1.14 (29)	1.17 (30)	1.16 (29)	0.50 (13)	0.48 (12)	14.19 (360)
Average snowfall inches (cm)	10.4 (26)	9.0 (23)	4.7 (12)	4.2 (11)	0.2 (0.51)	0.0 (0.0)	0.0 (0.0)	0.0 (0.0)	0.0 (0.0)	2.3 (5.8)	3.8 (9.7)	8.8 (22)	43.4 (110.01)
Average extreme snow depth inches (cm)	6.3 (16)	4.7 (12)	4.5 (11)	1.7 (4.3)	0.3 (0.76)	0.0 (0.0)	0.0 (0.0)	0.0 (0.0)	0.1 (0.25)	1.3 (3.3)	3.2 (8.1)	5.2 (13)	10.8 (27)
Average precipitation days (≥ 0.01 in)	4.4	4.0	5.8	7.3	9.4	9.4	6.2	5.4	5.2	5.1	3.7	4.2	70.1
Average snowy days (≥ 0.1 in)	3.2	3.1	2.4	1.4	0.2	0.0	0.0	0.0	0.1	0.7	1.9	3.0	16.0
Source 1: NOAA
Source 2: National Weather Service
