= Teigen, Montana =

Teigen
- Unincorporated community
- Teigen in 2026

- Location within the state of Montana
- Coordinates: 47°02′15″N 108°36′0″W
- Country: United States
- State: Montana
- County: Petroleum
- Elevation: 3,192 ft (973 m)
- Time zone: UTC-7 (Mountain (MST))
  - Summer (DST): UTC-6 (MDT)
- ZIP codes: 59084
- GNIS feature ID: 777448

Teigen is an unincorporated community in western Petroleum County, Montana, United States, stretching along Highway 200 west of the town of Winnett, the county seat of Petroleum County. Its elevation is 3,192 feet (973 m). Teigen's post office opened on November 24, 1914, and was closed on December 21, 1983,; the vicinity still has a separate ZIP code of 59084, which is serviced from Winnett

In 1884, Mons Teigen established a sheep ranch in the area with Knute and Ole Opheim; Teigen acquired sole ownership in 1897. The Milwaukee Land Company platted the Teigen townsite in 1914, and the post office opened the same year.

== Climate ==
According to the Köppen Climate Classification system, Teigen has a semi-arid climate, abbreviated "BSk" on climate maps.
