= Petroleum County, Montana =

County in Montana, United States

- County
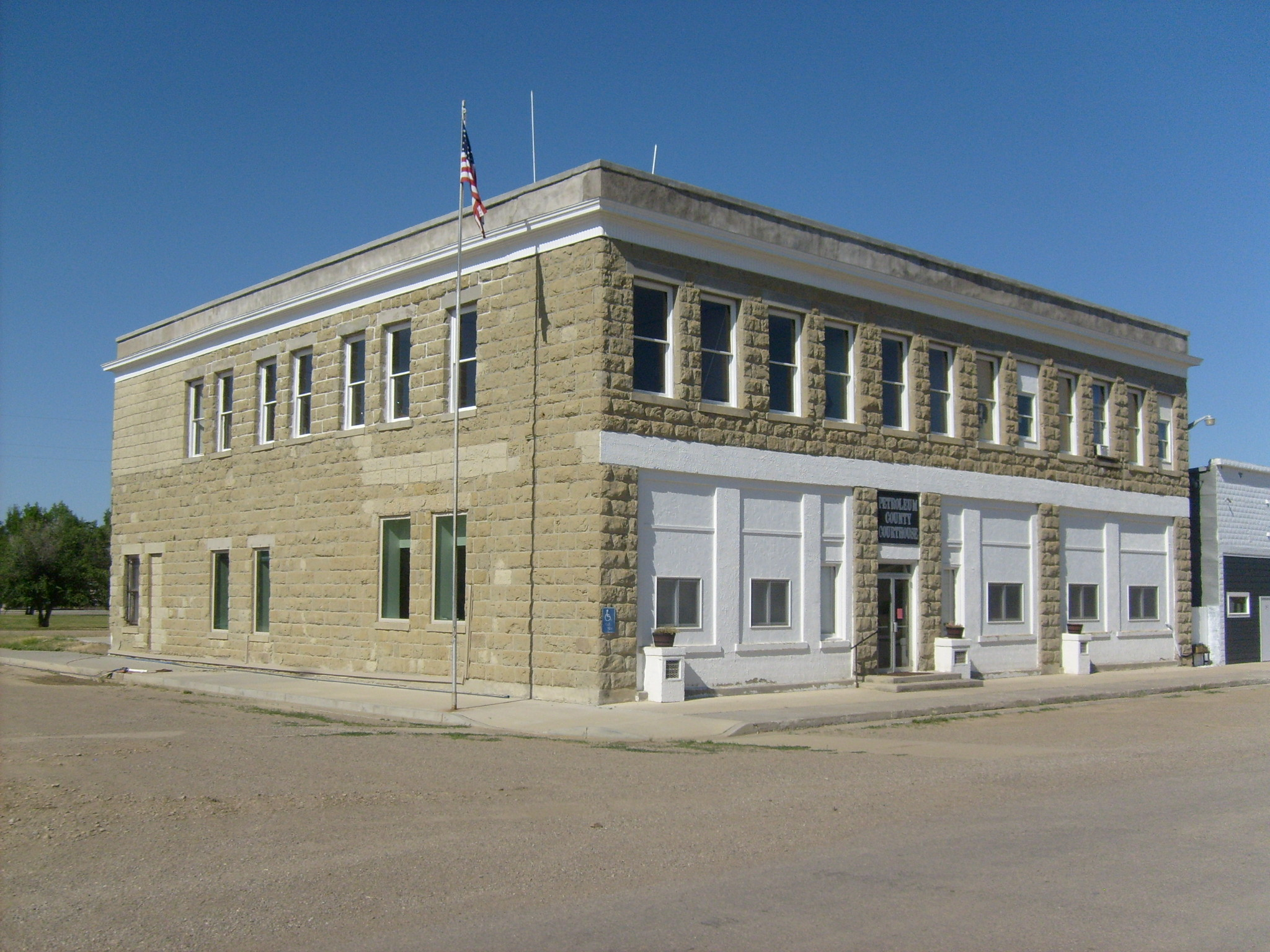
- Petroleum County Courthouse in Winnett

- Location within the U.S. state of Montana
- Coordinates: 47°07′N 108°16′W
- Country: United States
- State: Montana
- Founded: February 25, 1925
- Named for: Petroleum fields
- Seat: Winnett
- Largest town: Winnett

Area
  - Total: 1,674 sq mi (4,340 km^{2})
  - Land: 1,655 sq mi (4,290 km^{2})
  - Water: 19 sq mi (49 km^{2}) 1.1%

Population (2020)
  - Total: 496
  - Estimate (2025): 548 ▲
  - Density: 0.300/sq mi (0.116/km^{2})
- Time zone: UTC−7 (Mountain)
  - Summer (DST): UTC−6 (MDT)
- Congressional district: 2nd
- Website: petroleumcountymt.org
- Montana county number 55

Petroleum County is a county in the U.S. state of Montana. As of the 2020 census, the population was 496, making it the least populous county in Montana and the eighth-least populous in the United States. Its county seat is Winnett. The county's area was partitioned from Fergus County in 1925 to become the last of Montana's 56 counties to be organized.

== History ==
The area was home to Native American tribes of the Crow, Blackfoot, Nez Perce, and Sioux. In 1868 a trading post was established at the mouth of Musselshell River; it was named "Musselshell". Walter John Winnett, a rancher who had been adopted into the Sioux tribe, started a ranch in Montana Territory in 1879. His ranch house (built 1900) became a gathering place for the area. In 1910, he built a store and petitioned for a post office; thus Winnett became an official town.

Fort Magginis (built in western Fergus County in 1880) subdued Indian raids in the area, allowing cattle raising to prosper. Gold was also discovered in the Fergus County mountains; from 1911 to 1915, stakes in the county were claimed by prospectors. Area claims were limited to 320 acres (130 ha); in 1930 many of these lands reverted to the federal government as settlers deserted the town.

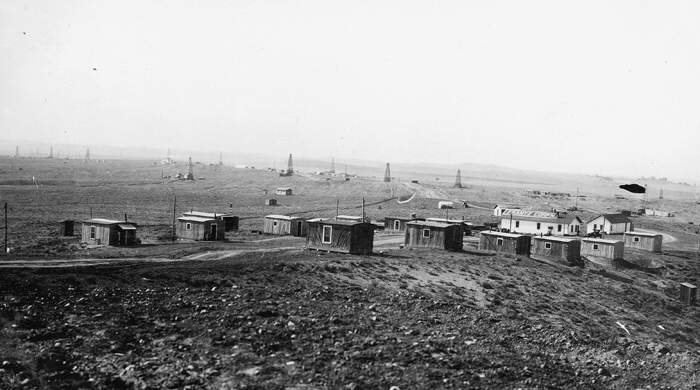
Cat Creek Oil Field

In February 1920, oil was discovered in the SE part of the county. This area developed into the Cat Creek Oil Field, producing high-grade crude. By 1922 it was producing 2.2 million barrels annually. In 1925, the state legislature split the eastern area of Fergus County into a separate entity, named Petroleum County, to denote its status as the first place in Montana where petroleum was discovered, and designated Winnett as its seat.

The county was always one of the most sparsely populated areas of the US, and the population has continued to decline. The 1930 census listed 2,045 residents. The county was brought under administrative format of the "county manager" in 1944. By the time of the 1980 census, the population was reduced to 685.

== Geography ==
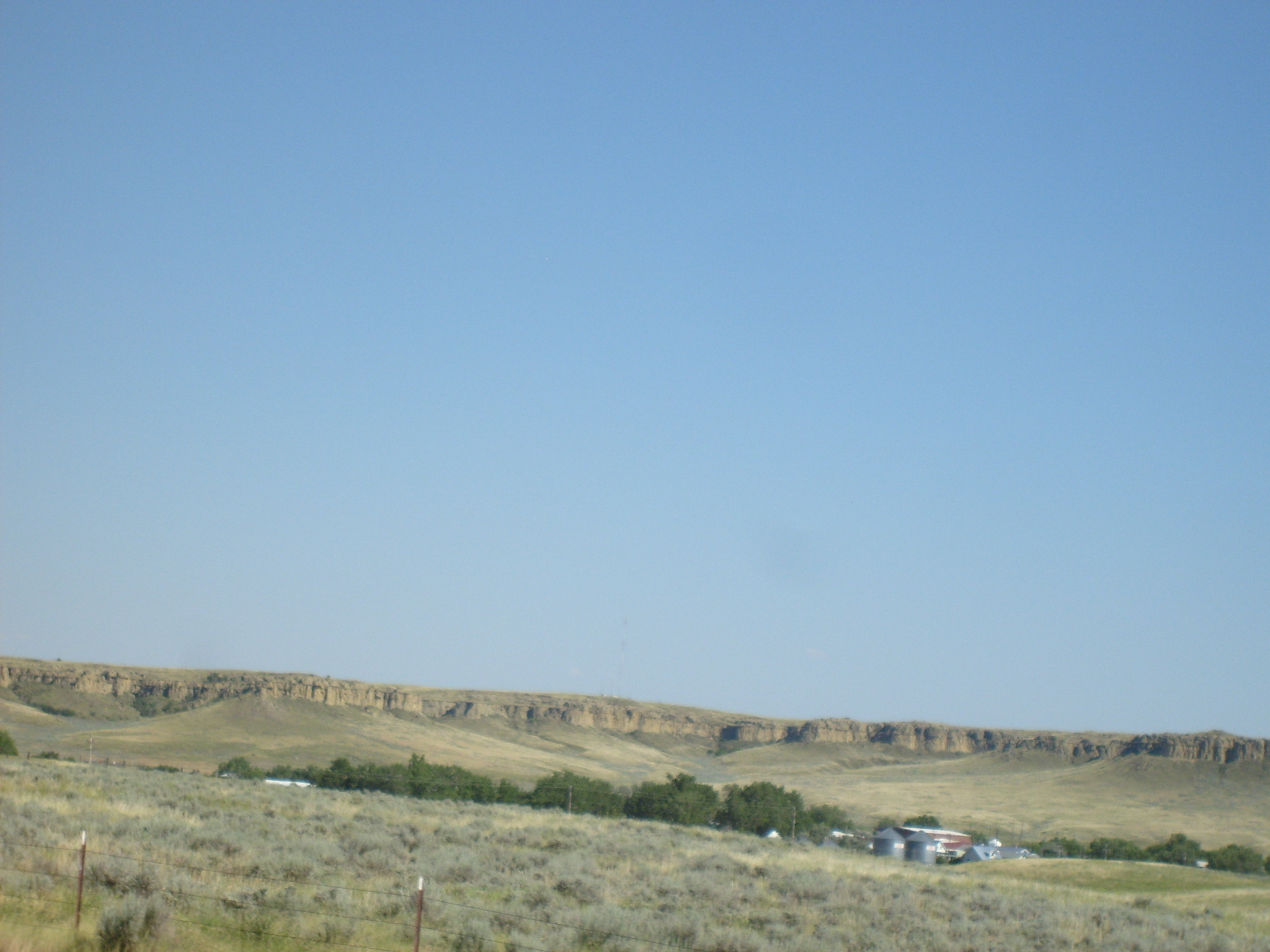
Winnett rims from the highway

The county's eastern boundary is formed by the Musselshell River. According to the United States Census Bureau, the county has a total area of 1,674 square miles (4,340 km^{2}), 1,655 square miles (4,290 km^{2}) land and 19 square miles (49 km^{2}) (1.1%) water. Its average elevation is 2,250–4,000 feet (690–1,220 m). The land lies in the Missouri Plateau section of the Great Plains. The uplands are generally of fairly level land and valleys while the general topography is of rolling hills and valleys except for sharp gullies on the side slopes of Missouri and Musselshell Rivers in certain stretches. The southern part of the county consists of moderate hill slopes and gentle valleys, interspersed with steep cliffs.

=== Highways ===
- U.S. Route 87
- State Highway 200
- State Highway 244

=== Rivers ===
- Missouri River
- Musselshell River

=== Lakes ===
- Wild Horse Lake
- Little Bear Lake
- War Horse Lake
- Petrolia Lake
- Yellow Water Reservoir
- Headman-Field Reservoir.

The northern part of the county has abundant surface water resources, with little agricultural land to use it. In other parts of the county, agriculture is reliant on underground water resources.

=== Adjacent counties ===
- Phillips County – north
- Garfield County – east
- Rosebud County – southeast
- Musselshell County – south
- Fergus County – west

=== Climate ===
The mean annual precipitation is 13 inches (330 mm). The mean annual temperature is in the range of 42–47 °F (6–8 °C). Frost is recorded during the season for 105–135 days. Rainfall is 13 inches (330 mm) in Flatwillow, it is 16 inches (410 mm) at Grass Range, and 13 inches (330 mm) at Mosby; at these locations, the mean winter temperatures are 24, 25 and 23 °F (−4, −4 and −5 °C) respectively. The lowest temperature recorded at Mosby was on January 24, 1969, of −43 °F (−42 °C). The maximum temperature recorded was 108 °F (42 °C) on July 19, 1960, at Flatwillow. Nearly 70% of rainfall occurs from April to September, also the growing season for many crops in the county. The average seasonal snowfall is 40 in (100 cm) at Flatwillow, 63 in (160 cm) at Grass Range and 36 in (91 cm) at Mosby. Average wind speed is about 17 miles per hour (7.6 m/s) and is higher in winter months than summer months.

=== Protected areas ===
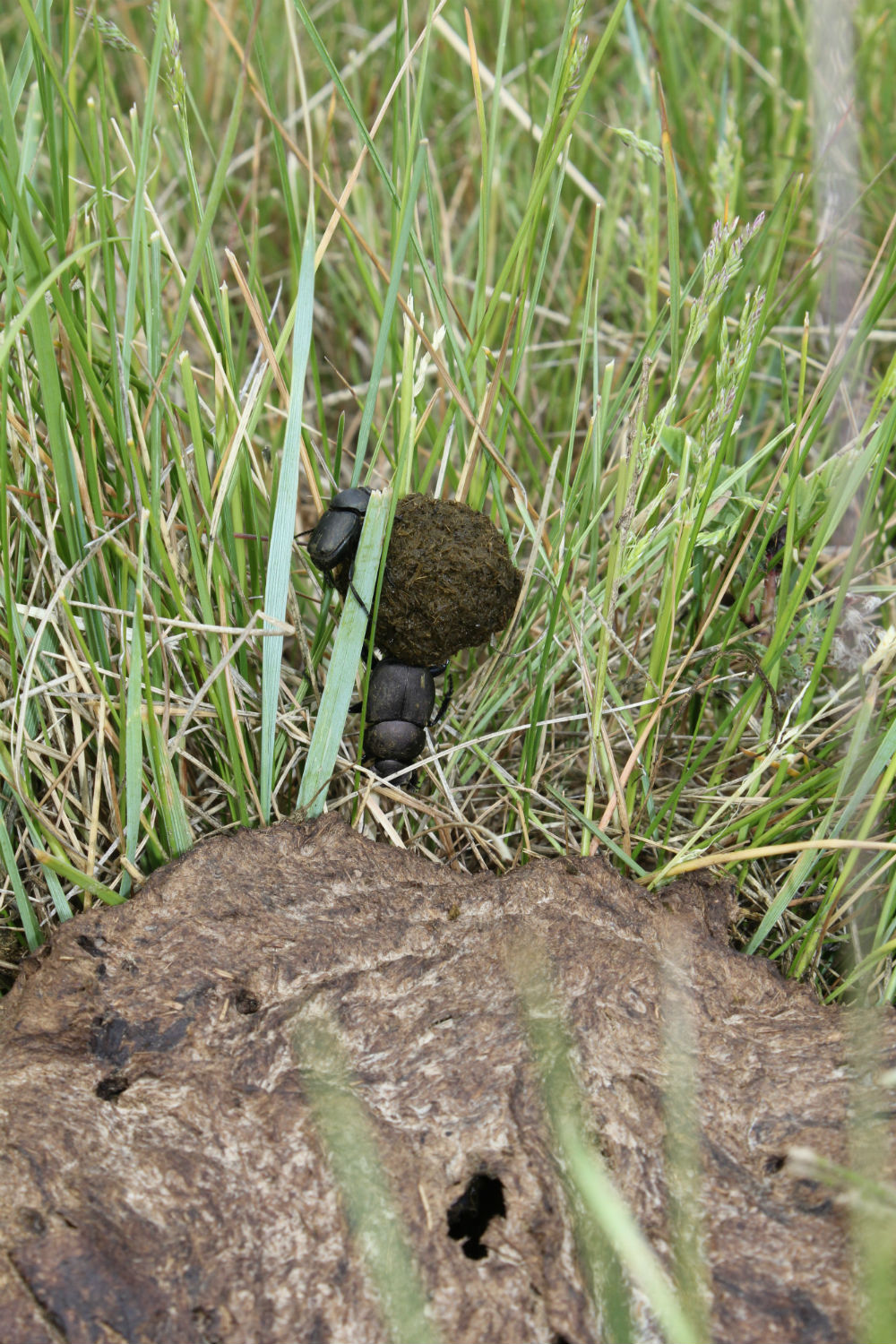
Dung beetles on the War Horse NWR

- War Horse National Wildlife Refuge
- Charles M. Russell National Wildlife Refuge

== Geology ==
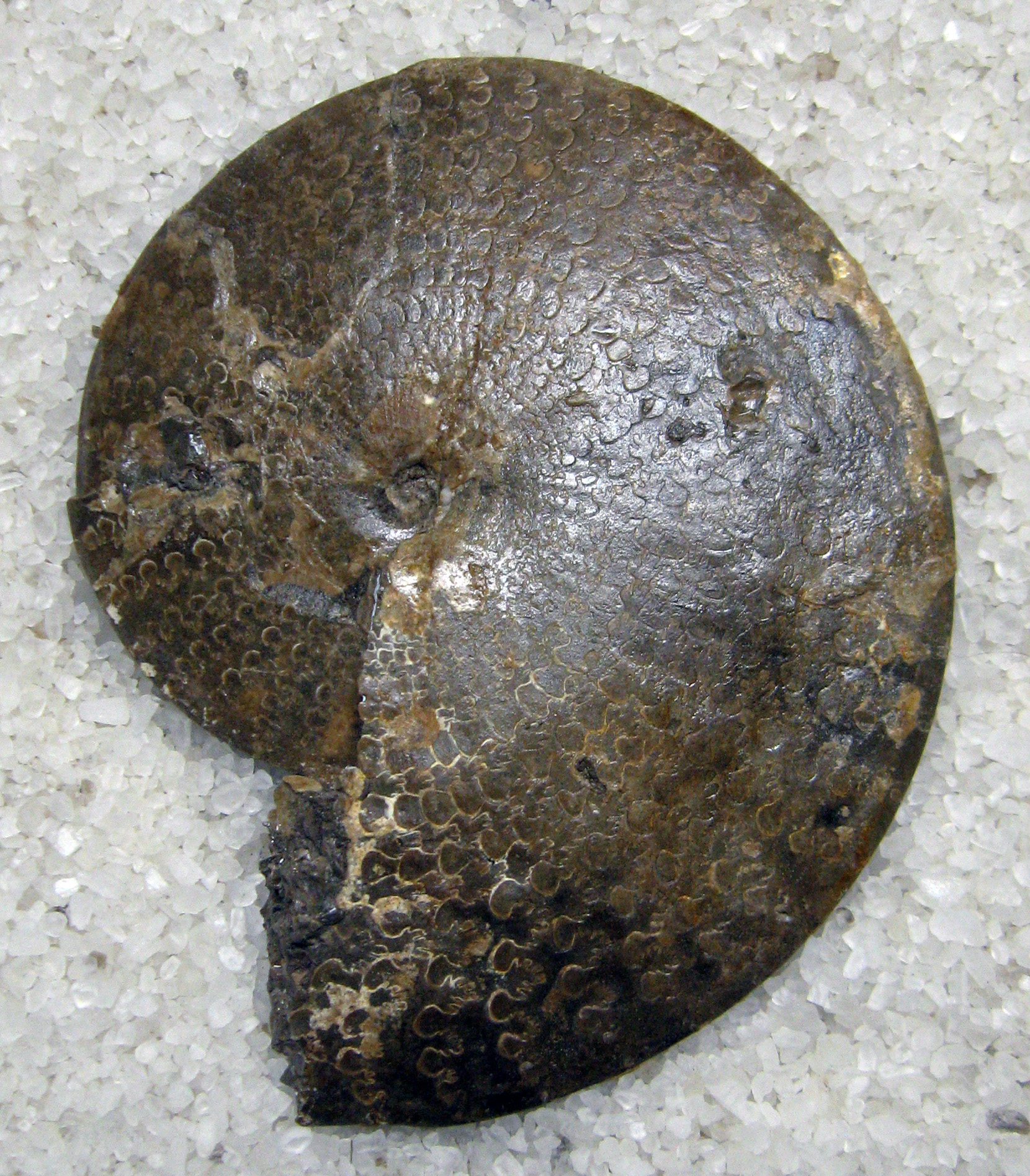
A ~11.5 cm diameter fossil ammonite Metengonoceras teigenense from the Cretaceous Mowry Shale, Petroleum County

A sandstone ridge with steep dips runs along the northern end of the county. This anticline is petroleum-bearing, and divides the county into two areas: to the north, geological formations of Bearpaw Shale or the Hell Creek Formation; to the south, formations containing older Cretaceous rocks. Marine shales of Cretaceous Age are found as outcrops throughout the county. Sandstones are noted in alternate sequences and are identified at deeper depths in Cat Creek.

A Tyrannosauridae fossil skeleton was discovered in the Judith River Formation, while Alamosaurus was discovered in the Hell Creek Formation.

== Flora and fauna ==
Rangeland contains wheatgrass, forbs, shrubs, green needlegrass, blue grama, big sagebrush, plains prickly pear, wooly Indian wheat, weedlike forbs, broom snakeweed, Nuttal saltbush, prairie sandreed, horizontal juniper, plains reedgrass, golden pea, and prairie rose. Forest land covers 64,296 acres of which 6,500 acres are characterized as commercial forest land; Ponderosa pine, Douglas fir, and Plains cottonwood are noted. The forest understory features obtuse sedge, creeping juniper, Rocky Mountain juniper, bluebunch wheatgrass, Little lbuestern, and hawksbeard. The county has elk, white-tailed deer, mule deer and pronghorn antelope. There are pheasant, eagles and Gray, or Hungarian, partridge.

== Economy ==
As of March 2012, the cost of living index in the county was 82.255 below the national average of 100. Petroleum and cattle raising are the principal economic activities; livestock farming accounts for 89.7% of the farm income. Crude oil from the Cat Creek and Rattlesnake Butte fields is piped to refineries in Billings. Agriculture, forestry, fishing and hunting are attributed to 66% of the population. 58.2% of people in the county are employed in mining. Another 15.5% are employed in educational, health and social services. Some of the notable ranches in the county are: McArthur Ranch, Maxwell Ranch, Crooked Creek Campground, Fail Ranch, and Novak Homestead. As of 2012, the average size of farms was 6,045 acres and the area under all harvested wheat grain was 14,720 acres (5,960 ha). The major crops grown in the county are wheat (both winter wheat and spring wheat) and barley. Alfalfa and grass hay are grown as cattle feed under irrigated conditions along the main river course and also on the banks of creeks such as Flat Willow, Box Elder, and Macdonald.

== Demographics ==
Historical population
Census	Pop.	Note	%±
1930	2,045		—
1940	1,083		−47.0%
1950	1,026		−5.3%
1960	894		−12.9%
1970	675		−24.5%
1980	655		−3.0%
1990	519		−20.8%
2000	493		−5.0%
2010	494		0.2%
2020	496		0.4%
2025 (est.)	548	▲	10.5%
U.S. Decennial Census; 1790–1960, 1900–1990, 1990–2000, 2010–2020

=== 2020 census ===
As of the 2020 census, the county had a population of 496. Of the residents, 16.7% were under the age of 18 and 31.0% were 65 years of age or older; the median age was 53.4 years. For every 100 females there were 110.2 males, and for every 100 females age 18 and over there were 110.7 males. 0.0% of residents lived in urban areas and 100.0% lived in rural areas.

The racial makeup of the county was 94.0% White, 0.0% Black or African American, 0.0% American Indian and Alaska Native, 0.2% Asian, 0.0% from some other race, and 5.8% from two or more races. Hispanic or Latino residents of any race comprised 1.0% of the population.

There were 228 households in the county, of which 27.6% had children under the age of 18 living with them and 15.4% had a female householder with no spouse or partner present. About 30.3% of all households were made up of individuals and 16.2% had someone living alone who was 65 years of age or older.

There were 333 housing units, of which 31.5% were vacant. Among occupied housing units, 78.1% were owner-occupied and 21.9% were renter-occupied. The homeowner vacancy rate was 1.1% and the rental vacancy rate was 12.3%.

=== 2010 census ===
As of the 2010 census, there were 494 people, 225 households, and 143 families residing in the county. The population density was 0.3 people per square mile (0.12 people/km^{2}). There were 324 housing units at an average density of 0.2 units per square mile (0.077/km^{2}). The racial makeup of the county was 98.8% white, 0.0% from other races, and 1.2% from two or more races. Those of Hispanic or Latino origin made up 1.0% of the population. In terms of ancestry, 35.1% were German, 15.9% were Norwegian, 15.7% were English, 13.2% were Irish, and 3.5% were American.

Of the 225 households, 28.0% had children under the age of 18 living with them, 55.1% were married couples living together, 4.0% had a female householder with no husband present, 36.4% were non-families, and 35.1% of all households were made up of individuals. The average household size was 2.20 and the average family size was 2.83. The median age was 47.3 years.

The median income for a household in the county was $36,875 and the median income for a family was $39,107. Males had a median income of $25,991 versus $21,705 for females. The per capita income for the county was $21,008. About 18.1% of families and 16.7% of the population were below the poverty line, including 26.3% of those under age 18 and 12.7% of those age 65 or over.

== Politics ==
Voters in Petroleum County generally vote Republican in national elections. Since 1928 they selected the Republican candidate in 78% of the elections. The last election where Petroleum went for a Democrat was in 1964.

United States presidential election results for Petroleum County, Montana
Year	Republican		Democratic		Third party(ies)	
Year	No.	%	No.	%	No.	%
1928	586	60.85%	372	38.63%	5	0.52%
1932	351	37.99%	544	58.87%	29	3.14%
1936	258	32.01%	523	64.89%	25	3.10%
1940	313	49.60%	316	50.08%	2	0.32%
1944	253	52.60%	225	46.78%	3	0.62%
1948	214	46.42%	235	50.98%	12	2.60%
1952	319	67.30%	155	32.70%	0	0.00%
1956	258	55.72%	205	44.28%	0	0.00%
1960	255	53.57%	221	46.43%	0	0.00%
1964	190	47.38%	210	52.37%	1	0.25%
1968	211	62.99%	98	29.25%	26	7.76%
1972	232	71.38%	87	26.77%	6	1.85%
1976	211	63.75%	110	33.23%	10	3.02%
1980	225	65.98%	90	26.39%	26	7.62%
1984	258	74.35%	86	24.78%	3	0.86%
1988	204	67.55%	91	30.13%	7	2.32%
1992	135	45.61%	61	20.61%	100	33.78%
1996	186	64.14%	62	21.38%	42	14.48%
2000	254	83.01%	36	11.76%	16	5.23%
2004	228	78.08%	55	18.84%	9	3.08%
2008	227	75.67%	68	22.67%	5	1.67%
2012	240	80.54%	49	16.44%	9	3.02%
2016	278	86.34%	30	9.32%	14	4.35%
2020	298	85.63%	39	11.21%	11	3.16%
2024	284	87.65%	37	11.42%	3	0.93%

=== Town ===
- Winnett (county seat)

=== Unincorporated communities ===
- Cat Creek
- Mosby (partial)
- Valentine (partial)

=== Former communities ===
- Flatwillow
- Teigen

== See also ==
- List of lakes in Petroleum County, Montana
- List of mountains in Petroleum County, Montana
- National Register of Historic Places listings in Petroleum County, Montana

== Bibliography ==
- John A Lindahl (1993). Soil Survey of Petroleum County, Montana. U.S. Dept. of Agriculture ("Soils Industry").
