= Cat Creek (Wisconsin) =

Stream in Wisconsin

Coordinates: 44°26′26″N 90°07′49″W

Cat Creek is a stream in the U.S. state of Wisconsin. It is a tributary to the Yellow River.

The presence of catfish may account for the name.
