= Ned Nefer and Teagan =

Couple formed by an American man and a mannequin

Ned Nefer and Teagan /ˈteɪɡən/ are a man/mannequin couple who gained national attention during a walk through rural New York.

They gained national attention in June 2011 when they walked, with the 150-pound (68 kg) Teagan situated in a wheelchair, from Syracuse, New York to Watertown, New York and later from Syracuse to Dansville, New York and Gainesville, New York. During his walk, he was interviewed by the Jefferson County Sheriff and social welfare officials, who did not find him to be dangerous and declined to take him into custody saying that "This is definitely one of the very oddest things I've ever come across, but he seems very happy. I wouldn't classify him as dangerous at all. He seemed quite happy in his own little world.".

Nefer and Teagan became Web celebrities, appearing in Facebook fan pages and YouTube videos. Nefer deflected the internet fame to Teagan, saying that "I've heard about the Facebook page and that's great, I guess, but she's really the star."

According to Nefer, he met a bodyless Teagan in 1986; she "told him how to build her." The Village Voice wryly described this origin story as "way more than a lot of men do for their women." Nefer claims that they were married in California on October 31, 1986. Nefer described his marriage to Teagan as such: "For us it's real. We weren't legally married. But on the ocean, we took our vows; we said words to each other and we've done our best to live by them."
