= Cat Creek, Montana =

Unincorporated community in Montana, United States

Cat Creek
- Unincorporated community
- Location within the state of Montana
- Coordinates: 47°3′55″N 108°0′22″W
- Country: United States
- State: Montana
- County: Petroleum
- Elevation: 2,907 ft (886 m)
- Time zone: UTC-7 (Mountain (MST))
  - Summer (DST): UTC-6 (MDT)
- ZIP codes: 59087
- Area code: 406
- GNIS feature ID: 805516

Cat Creek (also Frantz or Frantzville) (Note: The name of the community came from Frank Frantz, ex-Rough Rider and ex-Governor of Oklahoma, and the owner of the Frantz Corporation, the original developers of the oil field at Cat Creek.) is an unincorporated community in eastern Petroleum County, Montana, United States.

The Cat Creek community is located in Cat Creek Basin, in a "fertile valley land", 6 miles (9.7 km) long and 4 miles (6.4 km) wide, consisting of 16,000 acres. It lies along local roads east of the town of Winnett, the county seat of Petroleum County.

== Geography ==
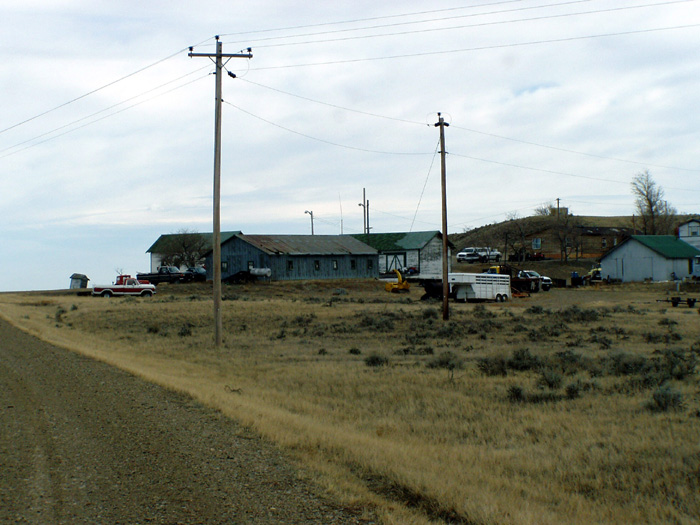
Cat Creek, Montana, c. 2005

Cat Creek Basin has a diversified topography, ranging from plains to badlands. The altitude of the area ranges from 4,100 feet (1,200 m) at the top of gravel benches in the southwestern part of the area to 2,200 feet (670 m) feet at the mouth of Musselshell River, with an average elevation of 2,907 feet (886 m). In areas adjoining Musselshell and Missouri Rivers, the surface is rugged, consisting of sandstone outcrop formations while the surrounding area varies from smooth, level, grass-covered gravel benches to the rough, uneven, sagebrush-covered plains, broken by numerous gullies, valleys and streams. The topography features hogbacks of sandstone escarpments and small dome-shaped buttes of igneous rocks.

The climate of Cat Creek is semi-arid, with a small annual rainfall, averaging 12 inches (300 mm). Although major rivers are present, secondary streams only in the nearby Big Snowy Mountains contain running water throughout most of the year. Extremes of temperature throughout the year range over 120 °F.

The vegetation of the Cat Creek area is diverse with the plains areas featuring a sparse growth of buffalo grass, black sage and greasewood while on the northern bluffs, bull pine grow. Blue joint grass, bull pine, Douglas fir and scrub cedar are found along the banks of larger streams in both shale and sandstone soil while cottonwood and willow grow on the bottom land of the rivers and larger creeks.

=== Wildlife ===
The Cat Creek area has deer, antelope, coyotes and mountain lions as well as smaller sage hens and jackrabbits proliferating.

== Industry ==
Dryland farming and cattle ranching were main occupations of Cat Creek since its founding, with farms more prevalent in the 1900s. With irrigation, large crops of alfalfa, grain, vegetables, berries and even fruit, such as apples, cherries and plums, may be raised. Small numbers of isolated sheep and cattle ranches were in the area, with cattle ranching, today, remaining the primary industry. A lengthy period of oil exploration and production was also part of the area's economy. An estimated 24 million barrels of oil have been produced from 150 oil wells in Cat Creek's 54-year petroleum production history. By 1975, the "oil boom" in Cat Creek had curtailed, with only 35 wells operating "on pump", and by the 1990s, had been essentially shut down as uneconomic.

Recent exploration has focused on deposits of natural gas. In 2002, the Chesapeake Energy Corporation announced a major natural gas discovery at its Cat Creek 1-19 well in the Comanche Lodge Prospect. In a 24-hour period, the well produced 17 million cubic feet of natural gas. In 2012, continued oil exploration in the Heath shale located in a sedimentary basin called the Central Montana Trough, saw a mix of private and public interests drilling 18 wells up to 10,000 feet (3,000 m) levels. Efforts to determine economical and efficient methods of retrieval have led to both horizontal and vertical drilling, as well as the use of hydraulic fracturing technology, with results from core samples still to be analyzed.

== History ==
The region around Cat Creek was largely unsettled until the 1860s, although River Crows and Ventre Indian hunters and trappers migrated through the area. Fort Musselshell trading post was built in Mosby, Montana, Garfield County, on the Missouri River, 13 miles (21 km) to the east. In the 1860s and 1870s, Fort Musselshell was a supply depot for "woodchoppers" and lumbermen who worked for the Missouri River steamboats, and as a trading post for hunters, (Note: The first white hunters in the region were known as "wolfers".) trappers and Indian trappers. The fort had a colorful history with Assiniboine and Sioux Indian attacks and becoming briefly, a cattle rustlers hangout that ended when a Vigilance Committee hanged a few rustlers.

Local legend had it that a cowboy roped a mountain lion in a creek flowing into the Musselshell River, giving rise to the name, Cat Creek. Maps, in succession, named different creeks by that name until 1900, when the location of Cat Creek Basin was finally confirmed as the present site. The area known as Cat Creek Basin was also referred to as the Shay community from 1910 to 1920, after one of the early homesteaders, who deeded land for a school and cemetery in his name. In late 1919, the Frantz Corporation began oil exploration on a creek near Winnett, Montana, flowing into the Musselshell River. (Note: The Elk Basin Consolidated Petroleum Company owned controlling interest in the Frantz Corporation, which in turn, used the Anaconda Copper Company as its drilling operation.) The first major commercial oil field discovery in Montana was at the West Dome of the Cat Creek field, Eastern Fergus County, at a depth of 1,015 feet (309 m). The oil was considered "the highest grade of oil known to any oil fields." The discovery well, named "Antelope No. 1," was showing oil in November 1919 and put into full use by the Frantz Corporation on February 19, 1920.

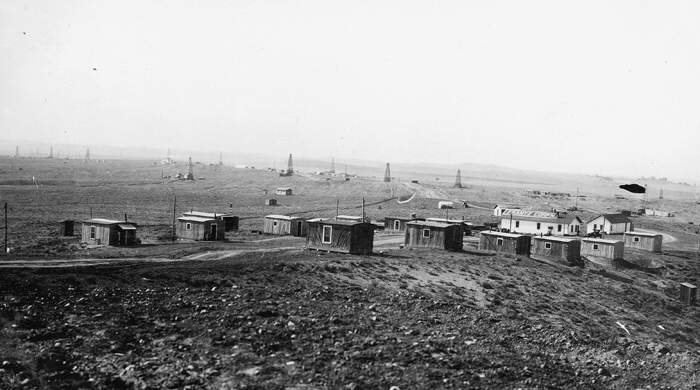
"Tar Shack city" at Cat Creek, 1921

John S. "Curley" Meek, one of the first drillers in the Cat Creek area, stated that "there was no place to store the oil, so it was dammed up in a coulee and given away to ranchers and farmers as sheep and cow dip until they began using it in their cars." Due to a lack of storage facilities, the oil was directed into a coulee, where it became a tourist attraction; it was of such a high quality that tractors and Ford Model T automobiles could run on the oil directly from the ground, which was distributed free of charge to everyone. Storage tanks were soon constructed; during the summer of 1920, the Frantz Corporation constructed a 2 inches (51 mm) diameter pipeline to carry the oil to Winnett.

With the excitement over the discovery of oil at Cat Creek, and frenzy to develop the oil field by independent interests, a study of the 75 townships in the area was undertaken by the U.S. Geological Survey during the summers of 1920 and 1921. The subsequent report, published in 1926, involved the collection of information for use in the administration of the Federal oil leasing law. The report established the government's interest in the area with the results of field work that could be used in the development of the recently discovered Cat Creek and Devils Basin oil fields, and the search for new fields. (Note: The rich oil find in Cat Creek led to a scandal, part of other scandals later collectively known as the "Teapot Dome Scandal," involving Secretary of the Interior Albert Bacon Fall who controlled the administration of the Federal oil leasing law. In 1922, Fall gave the Lewistown Oil and Refining Co. a contract to buy the government's Cat Creek royalty oil, including a secret option to renew their contract after five years. The contract was eventually deemed illegal.)

The area surrounding Cat Creek is very isolated; supplies were hauled from Winnett, the only large settlement in the area, 20 miles (32 km) to the west of the oil field, to the site by wagon and horses. Winnett was connected by rail, and became the supply depot for mining activities, with the Midwest Refining Company pumping oil through a 4 inches (100 mm) pipe to the railhead there, and shipped by rail to refineries in Wyoming. (Note: Dovetail, another small town near Cat Creek, was started in 1912, but like all the communities in the area, was not sustainable, and is now a ghost town.)

By May 1920, production from one well, drilled to a depth of 660 feet (200 m), had totaled up to 200 barrels a day. (Note: The first three commercial oil wells drilled up to 1,000 feet (300 m) depths, were named "Lucky Strike", "Big Six" and "The Republic".) In April 1921, 30 producing wells owned by six different companies, were at work. In a "raw, roaring oil camp", as many as 300 men lived in the area in tar paper shacks for families, with company bunkhouses for single men, a company cook house and a recreation hall. In the town that sprang up, only a post office, church, school and cemetery provided services. A post office was established in Cat Creek in 1922, remaining active until 1996. (Note: Although the post office and recreational hall remained in use, most of the townsite was abandoned after 1975; the recreational hall collapsed in 2011.)

With the continued development of the Cat Creek oil fields and the resultant increase in the area's population, the Montana Legislature voted on November 24, 1924, to form a new county, sectioned off from eastern Fergus County and western Garfield County. Petroleum County officially became Montana's 56th and final county in February 1925. Winnett, with a population in 1923 of 2,000, became the county seat.

The Elk Basin Consolidated Petroleum Company later sold the Cat Creek field in 1924 to Mutual Oil Company of Casper, Wyoming, for $450,000. In turn, Mutual Oil sold the field in 1938 to Continental Oil, an oil distributor from Ogden, Utah. After the lucrative oil wells stopped producing in 1975, the community of Cat Creek began to deteriorate as jobs also dried up, with an estimated population of only 494 (2010) residents in Petroleum County. (Note: The 2003 U.S. Census listed 491 residents in Petroleum County.)
