= Cat Creek (Missouri) =

Stream in the U.S. state of Missouri

Cat Creek is a stream in Grundy and Harrison counties in the U.S. state of Missouri. It is a tributary of the Thompson River.

The stream headwaters arise in Harrison County just south of US Route 136 approximately ten miles east of Bethany at 40°16′28″N 93°49′50″W and an elevation of approximately 965 ft (294 m). The stream flows south to southeast passing through the Wayne Hellton Memorial Wildlife Area. It then turns to the east, crosses under Missouri Route CC and enters northwest Grundy County approximately 1.5 miles west of its confluence with the Thompson River. The confluence is at 40°12′15″N 93°44′10″W and an elevation of 771 ft (235 m).

Cat Creek may have been named for the wildcats in the area.

== See also ==
- List of rivers of Missouri
