= List of United States tornadoes from May to July 2020 =

United States tornadoes from May to July 2020
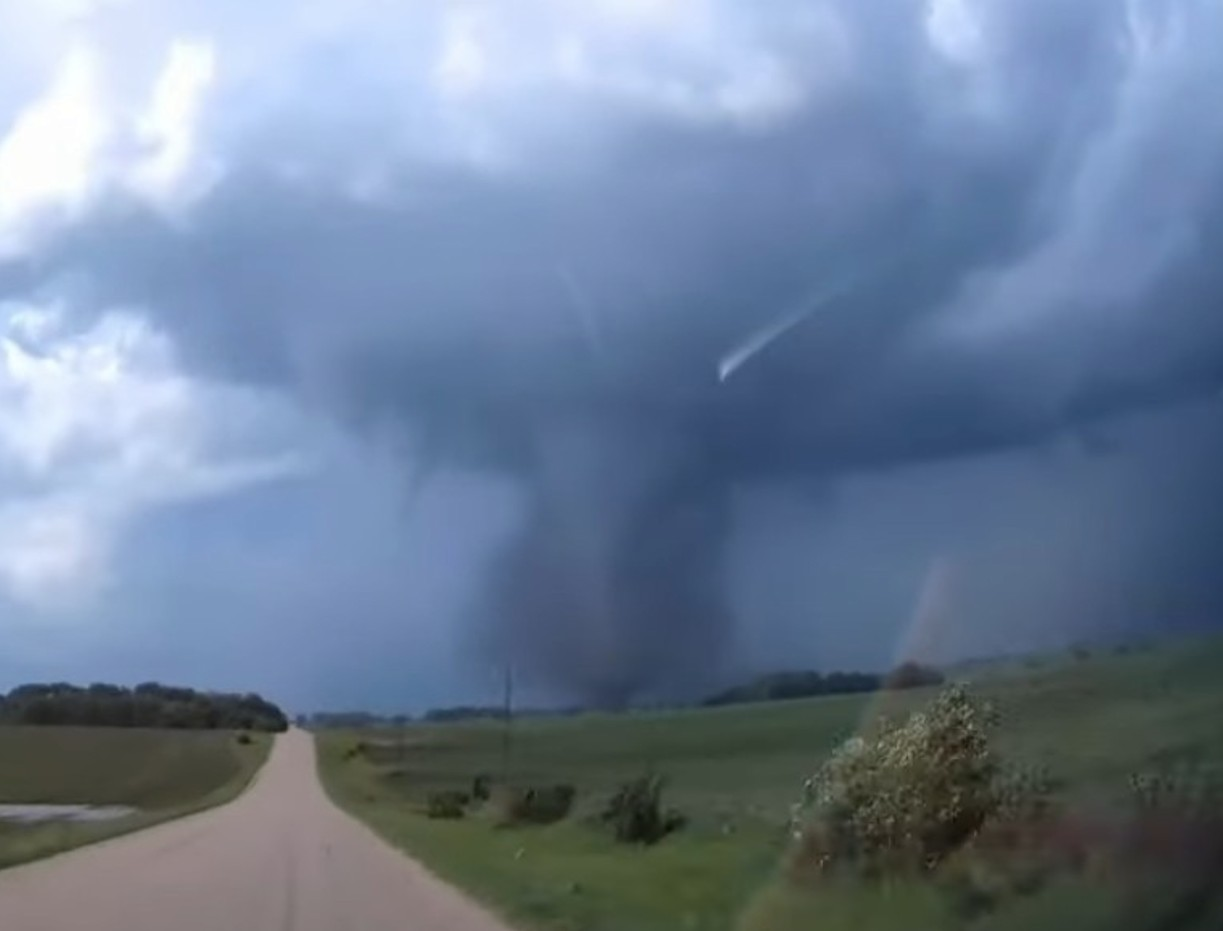
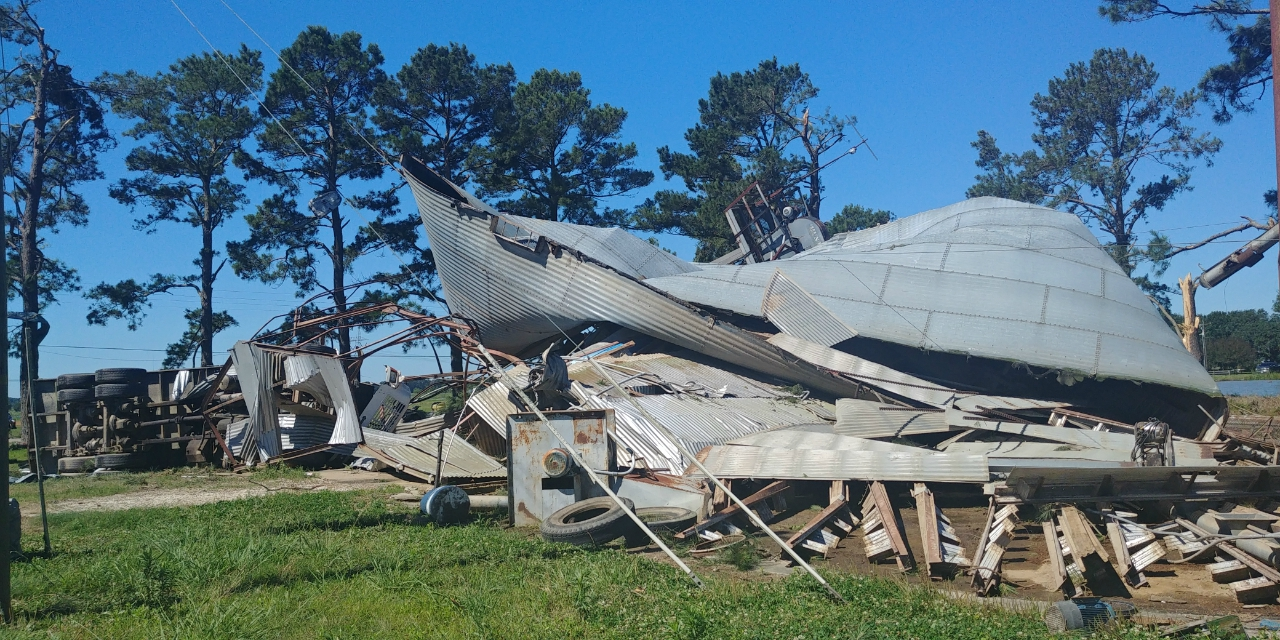
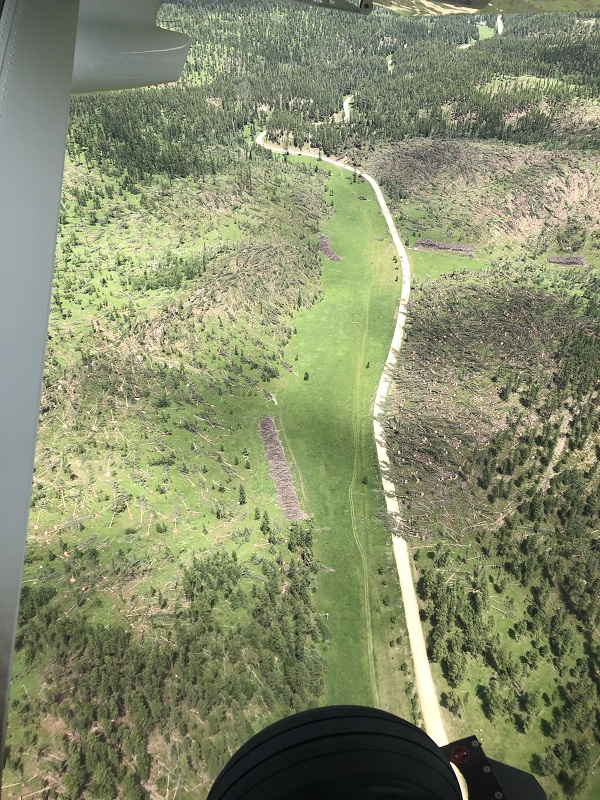
- Clockwise from top: A destructive EF4 tornado near Ashby, Minnesota on July 8; Trees blown down after an EF2 tornado tracked through areas south of Tinton, South Dakota on July 6; A metal building after an EF3 tornado northwest of Church Point, Louisiana on May 17.
- Timespan: May 3 – July 29
- Maximum rated tornado: EF4 tornado: Ashby, Minnesota on July 8
- Tornadoes: 316
- Fatalities: 2
- Injuries: 14

This page documents confirmed tornadoes from May to July 2020 via various weather forecast offices of the National Weather Service. Based on the 1991–2010 averaging period, 276 tornadoes occur across the United States throughout May, 243 in June, and 143 in July. The climatological peak for tornadic activity in the country, May features a risk area that is concentrated throughout the U.S. Great Plains, especially in the states of Texas, Oklahoma, and Kansas. This is a shift from earlier months where the highest concentration of tornadoes is focused around the U.S. Gulf Coast. Historical data shows a substantial drop in the number of violent (EF4+) tornadoes in May versus April, likely due to the loss of the amplified winter jet stream, and perhaps as a result of tornadoes tracking over more sparsely populated areas. However, intense tornadoes are still possible in any month of the year. Tornado activity in June typically shifts more north and west across the Plains, especially Northern Colorado and the Texas Panhandle. Tornado activity in July normally affects the Northern Plains and the Great Lakes.

In May 2020 was extremely inactive. The jet stream changed directions to flow south, a direction unfavorable for tornadoes. In the mid-part of the month, the pattern flipped and the jew stream turned north, allowing for cooler and drier air to move into the US, suppressing widespread thunderstorm activity. This resulted in the month May 2020 having only 126 verified tornadoes, turning it into one of the least active months on record. No moderate- or high-risk outlooks were issued by the Storm Prediction Center throughout the month, a first since archives of outlooks began in 2002. The dry conditions persisted into June as a high pressure built over the Great Plains and east, suppressing thunderstorms. This made June even less active, with only 92 confirmed tornadoes. In addition, no EF2+ tornado was confirmed during June, this first time this had occurred since records began 1950. However, July saw its first violent tornado since 2004 despite finishing well below average with only 98 confirmed tornadoes in the month. June and July also saw several tornadoes coming from tropical cyclones.

Tornado counts listed below are considered preliminary until final publication in the database of the National Centers for Environmental Information.

== United States yearly total ==
Confirmed tornadoes by Enhanced Fujita rating
EFU	EF0	EF1	EF2	EF3	EF4	EF5	Total
109	443	421	89	18	6	0	1,086

== May ==
Confirmed tornadoes by Enhanced Fujita rating
EFU	EF0	EF1	EF2	EF3	EF4	EF5	Total
36	48	40	1	1	0	0	126

=== May 3 event ===
List of confirmed tornadoes – Sunday, May 3, 2020 (Note: All dates are based on the local time zone where the tornado touched down; however, all times are in Coordinated Universal Time for consistency.)
EF#	Location	County / Parish	State	Start Coord.	Time (UTC)	Path length	Max width
EF1	Marston	New Madrid	MO	36.523°N 89.6631°W	18:56–19:01	5.84 mi (9.40 km)	150 yd (140 m)
EF1	Several farm buildings were destroyed and had their concrete pillars pulled from the ground. Marston City Hall and an apartment building lost parts of their roofs. At least three power poles were broken. Numerous trees were uprooted and snapped.						

=== May 4 event ===
List of confirmed tornadoes – Monday, May 4, 2020
EF#	Location	County / Parish	State	Start Coord.	Time (UTC)	Path length	Max width
EF0	S of Grandin	Carter	MO	36.8328°N 90.8699°W	21:23–21:29	4.04 mi (6.50 km)	50 yd (46 m)
EF0	A small section of the roof of a manufactured home was removed, several wooden power poles were pushed over, and dozens of trees were downed.						
EF1	E of Lexington	Cleveland	OK	35.034°N 97.198°W	22:50–22:54	2 mi (3.2 km)	50 yd (46 m)
EF1	A mobile home had roof damage. Trees were downed just north of SH-39.						
EF0	S of Winchester	Franklin	TN	35.1439°N 86.11°W	02:50–02:54	1.05 mi (1.69 km)	100 yd (91 m)
EF0	A manufactured home sustained minor roof damage, and several trees were uprooted, with one falling on a second house.						

=== May 5 event ===
List of confirmed tornadoes – Tuesday, May 5, 2020
EF#	Location	County / Parish	State	Start Coord.	Time (UTC)	Path length	Max width
EF1	SE of Chester	Chester	SC	34.644°N 81.19°W	22:32–22:39	4.57 mi (7.35 km)	100 yd (91 m)
EF1	A house and a mobile home sustained siding damage, and numerous large trees were snapped or uprooted.						
EF2	S of Richburg to SW of Heath Springs	Chester, Lancaster	SC	34.592°N 81.026°W	22:46–23:07	13.98 mi (22.50 km)	200 yd (180 m)
EF2	Numerous large trees were snapped or uprooted. Fallen trees landed on a vehicle and destroyed a house.						
EF1	S of Longville to NE of Gillis	Beauregard, Calcasieu	LA	30.5666°N 93.2348°W	02:45–02:59	13.56 mi (21.82 km)	75 yd (69 m)
EF1	Outbuildings and carports were damaged, shingles were ripped off houses, and trees were snapped.						

=== May 8 event ===
List of confirmed tornadoes – Friday, May 8, 2020
EF#	Location	County / Parish	State	Start Coord.	Time (UTC)	Path length	Max width
EF1	Mamou	Evangeline	LA	30.6317°N 92.4207°W	19:35–19:36	0.63 mi (1.01 km)	100 yd (91 m)
EF1	A few homes and businesses were damaged in town, and trees were blown down.						

=== May 12 event ===
List of confirmed tornadoes – Tuesday, May 12, 2020
EF#	Location	County / Parish	State	Start Coord.	Time (UTC)	Path length	Max width
EF0	McMahan	Caldwell	TX	29.8526°N 97.5256°W	14:09–14:11	0.73 mi (1.17 km)	20 yd (18 m)
EF0	A house was damaged, a barn sustained roof damage, and several trees were downed in McMahan.						
EF0	NW of Smithville	Bastrop	TX	30.0196°N 97.2105°W	15:54–16:01	2.6 mi (4.2 km)	20 yd (18 m)
EF0	A few homes were damaged, and several trees were downed.						
EFU	SSE of Paige	Bastrop	TX	30.1485°N 97.0986°W	16:28	0.05 mi (0.080 km)	20 yd (18 m)
EFU	A storm chaser reported a tornado. No damage was found.						

=== May 13 event ===
List of confirmed tornadoes – Wednesday, May 13, 2020
EF#	Location	County / Parish	State	Start Coord.	Time (UTC)	Path length	Max width
EF0	E of Coyanosa	Pecos	TX	31.17°N 102.8647°W	21:30–21:32	0.82 mi (1.32 km)	50 yd (46 m)
EF0	The public reported a landspout tornado; no damage was found.						

=== May 14 event ===
List of confirmed tornadoes – Thursday, May 14, 2020
EF#	Location	County / Parish	State	Start Coord.	Time (UTC)	Path length	Max width
EFU	NW of Bushong	Lyon	KS	38.71°N 96.31°W	01:05–01:09	2.66 mi (4.28 km)	25 yd (23 m)
EFU	A brief, small tornado was observed by storm chasers; it did not cause damage.						
EFU	NE of Alta Vista	Wabaunsee	KS	38.89°N 96.4214°W	01:20–01:26	0.97 mi (1.56 km)	75 yd (69 m)
EFU	A brief, small tornado was observed by storm chasers; it did not cause damage.						
EFU	S of Council Grove	Morris	KS	38.5674°N 96.4891°W	01:49–02:00	3.69 mi (5.94 km)	50 yd (46 m)
EFU	This tornado was observed by storm chasers but caused no damage.						
EF0	NW of Bushong	Lyon	KS	38.6790°N 96.2829°W	01:53–02:06	1.6 mi (2.6 km)	50 yd (46 m)
EF0	An outbuilding sustained minor damage, and a trampoline was blown over.						
EF1	NE of Cambridge	Henry	IL	41.3179°N 90.0762°W	03:16–03:20	4.26 mi (6.86 km)	100 yd (91 m)
EF1	Trees and outbuildings were damaged on two farmsteads. A 70 feet (21 m) silo was badly damaged.						

=== May 15 event ===
List of confirmed tornadoes – Friday, May 15, 2020
EF#	Location	County / Parish	State	Start Coord.	Time (UTC)	Path length	Max width
EF1	Keefeton	Muskogee	OK	35.6112°N 95.3503°W	14:38–14:49	4.8 mi (7.7 km)	525 yd (480 m)
EF1	Outbuildings were damaged, trees were uprooted, sixteen homes or mobile homes were damaged or destroyed, and multiple power poles were snapped by this high-end EF1 tornado.						
EF1	Wilton	Saratoga	NY	43.182°N 73.755°W	21:59–22:01	1.78 mi (2.86 km)	50 yd (46 m)
EF1	Softwood trees were snapped or uprooted nearly continuously along the path, some of which fell onto homes in town. Several street signs were blown down and displaced. Sheeting from a warehouse roof, along with an empty trailer, were blown on top of a van.						
EFU	ESE of Davidson	Tillman	OK	34.229°N 99.006°W	00:32	0.3 mi (0.48 km)	50 yd (46 m)
EFU	A storm chaser photographed a tornado. No damage was found.						

=== May 16 event ===
List of confirmed tornadoes – Saturday, May 16, 2020
EF#	Location	County / Parish	State	Start Coord.	Time (UTC)	Path length	Max width
EF1	Mauriceville	Orange	TX	30.1811°N 93.8575°W	11:48–11:53	4.47 mi (7.19 km)	25 yd (23 m)
EF1	Several trees were snapped or uprooted in Mauriceville.						
EF1	Malakoff	Henderson	TX	32.1659°N 96.0283°W	17:36–17:38	1.03 mi (1.66 km)	150 yd (140 m)
EF1	Several trees were blown onto cars and homes in town, causing minor damage. A nursing home had significant roof damage. A small propane supply business building was completely destroyed at high-end EF1 intensity.						
EF0	NW of Mount Vernon	Franklin	TX	33.2381°N 95.2874°W	18:33–18:34	0.64 mi (1.03 km)	30 yd (27 m)
EF0	A metal outbuilding lost parts of its roof, and the garage of a home was damaged. Many tree limbs were downed, and several trees were uprooted.						
EF0	N of Mabank	Van Zandt, Kaufman	TX	32.4071°N 96.0645°W	18:47–18:50	2.19 mi (3.52 km)	250 yd (230 m)
EF0	This high-end EF0 tornado produced intermittent tree and power line damage, as well as roof damage to several manufactured homes, site-built homes, and a couple of farm outbuildings.						
EFU	SW of Foreman, AR	Little River (AR), McCurtain (OK)	AR, OK	33.673°N 94.4697°W	19:35–19:38	2.24 mi (3.60 km)	20 yd (18 m)
EFU	This tornado was observed over open field and caused no damage.						
EFU	Wright Patman Lake	Cass, Bowie	TX	33.2782°N 94.186°W	20:37–20:39	2.63 mi (4.23 km)	40 yd (37 m)
EFU	A waterspout was well-documented but caused no damage.						
EF1	NE of Leary	Bowie	TX	33.502°N 94.1675°W	22:05–22:06	0.19 mi (0.31 km)	30 yd (27 m)
EF1	Roofing was torn from a home, and two trees were toppled. Video of this tornado was captured on a phone camera.						
EF1	E of Texarkana	Miller	AR	33.4493°N 93.8548°W	22:16–22:18	2.16 mi (3.48 km)	30 yd (27 m)
EF1	Shingles were ripped off a house, and the structure's carport was destroyed. A wooden power poles were snapped and trees were uprooted.						
EF0	WNW of Tom	McCurtain	OK	33.7535°N 94.642°W	22:20–22:21	0.13 mi (0.21 km)	20 yd (18 m)
EF0	A few small trees and branches were damaged.						
EF0	W of Fulton	Little River	AR	33.6069°N 93.9306°W	22:36–22:37	0.09 mi (0.14 km)	20 yd (18 m)
EF0	The roof of a house was partially damaged, and multiple large tree limbs were downed.						
EF1	NW of Waldo	Columbia, Nevada	AR	33.411°N 93.3361°W	22:39–22:42	2.65 mi (4.26 km)	50 yd (46 m)
EF1	A car was flipped, and several large trees were uprooted.						
EF1	E of Bodcaw	Nevada	AR	33.5312°N 93.3703°W	22:56–22:58	1.89 mi (3.04 km)	40 yd (37 m)
EF1	A metal overhang was tossed about 150 yd (140 m), and several trees were snapped or uprooted.						
EF0	E of Blevins	Hempstead	AR	33.868°N 93.5217°W	23:46–23:47	0.47 mi (0.76 km)	20 yd (18 m)
EF0	A brief tornado documented via pictures downed a large tree limb.						

=== May 17 event ===
List of confirmed tornadoes – Sunday, May 17, 2020
EF#	Location	County / Parish	State	Start Coord.	Time (UTC)	Path length	Max width
EFU	N of Millington	Kendall	IL	41.61°N 88.59°W	20:15–20:17	0.69 mi (1.11 km)	25 yd (23 m)
EFU	A brief tornado with no known damage was reported by a trained storm spotter.						
EF0	NNE of Macon to ENE of Elwin	Macon	IL	39.7295°N 88.9909°W	21:06–21:14	4.04 mi (6.50 km)	75 yd (69 m)
EF0	Minor damage was done to trees.						
EFU	S of Coal City	Grundy	IL	41.26°N 88.28°W	22:26–22:27	0.52 mi (0.84 km)	25 yd (23 m)
EFU	A brief tornado was reported by emergency management with no known damage.						
EF1	S of Oakdale	Allen	LA	30.7461°N 92.7104°W	22:41–22:49	4.34 mi (6.98 km)	25 yd (23 m)
EF1	Several trees were snapped or uprooted.						
EF0	N of Holly Beach	Cameron	LA	29.905°N 93.5211°W	23:01–23:02	1.03 mi (1.66 km)	10 yd (9.1 m)
EF0	This tornado remained over marshland.						
EF0	SSE of De Quincy	Calcasieu	LA	30.4314°N 93.4241°W	23:40–23:41	0.1 mi (0.16 km)	10 yd (9.1 m)
EF0	Photos and videos were taken of this tornado. It remained in wooded areas.						
EF0	SE of Mamou	Evangeline	LA	30.6039°N 92.3747°W	01:00–01:01	0.2 mi (0.32 km)	10 yd (9.1 m)
EF0	Videos were taken of this tornado. It remained over swampland.						
EF3	NW of Church Point	Acadia, St. Landry	LA	30.4597°N 92.2678°W	01:31–01:41	3.93 mi (6.32 km)	100 yd (91 m)
EF3	1 death– A mid-range EF3 tornado moved southeast toward Church Point, initially causing minor structural damage before producing major damage near the Acadia/St. Landry parish line. One home was picked up and thrown 50 yards (46 m) to the south, destroying it. Three people were in the home at the time; one person was killed and two sustained significant injuries. Nearby, four mobile homes were destroyed. Two were flipped and separated from their frames, the third was rolled over onto an SUV, and the fourth was pulled off its blocks and received significant structural damage. A few vehicles were flipped as well. The tornado briefly passed into St. Landry Parish, where two grain dryers were destroyed at a farm, and a tractor-trailer used for transporting crops was flipped onto a road. It then re-entered Acadia Parish and continued toward Church Point before dissipating. Numerous trees were downed along the path, including a large tree that fell onto a home near the end of the path. Nine people were injured by the tornado.						

=== May 18 event ===
List of confirmed tornadoes – Monday, May 18, 2020
EF#	Location	County / Parish	State	Start Coord.	Time (UTC)	Path length	Max width
EF0	NW of Ione	Sacramento	CA	38.4°N 121.04°W	19:21–19:26	0.1 mi (0.16 km)	20 yd (18 m)
EF0	A brief tornado was observed over open country south-southwest of Michigan Bar. No damage occurred.						
EF0	Lilly Chapel	Madison	OH	39.8674°N 83.2909°W	20:49–20:53	1.92 mi (3.09 km)	75 yd (69 m)
EF0	A barn was destroyed, with metal roofing thrown across a road, and several trees were downed.						

=== May 19 event ===
List of confirmed tornadoes – Tuesday, May 19, 2020
EF#	Location	County / Parish	State	Start Coord.	Time (UTC)	Path length	Max width
EFU	N of Lintner	Piatt	IL	39.8278°N 88.6535°W	23:07–23:15	0.88 mi (1.42 km)	25 yd (23 m)
EFU	A trained storm spotter reported a landspout tornado. No damage was found.						
EFU	NNE of Cheraw	Otero	CO	38.17°N 103.49°W	02:15–02:22	1 mi (1.6 km)	20 yd (18 m)
EFU	This tornado was confirmed by a state trooper. No damage was found.						

=== May 20 event ===
List of confirmed tornadoes – Wednesday, May 20, 2020
EF#	Location	County / Parish	State	Start Coord.	Time (UTC)	Path length	Max width
EF1	WSW of Johns Island	Charleston	SC	32.7159°N 80.1166°W	15:47–15:50	0.77 mi (1.24 km)	300 yd (270 m)
EF1	Many trees were snapped or uprooted. Some homes sustained roof damage from fallen trees and limbs.						
EF0	E of Greeley–Weld County Airport	Weld	CO	40.4204°N 104.5982°W	00:38–00:42	0.9 mi (1.4 km)	50 yd (46 m)
EF0	This short-lived landspout tornado kicked up dust but caused no damage.						
EF0	E of Eaton	Weld	CO	40.5185°N 104.6582°W	00:41–00:45	1.4 mi (2.3 km)	50 yd (46 m)
EF0	A farm was struck, with barn doors being blown in and a fiberglass canoe being lofted into a tree.						
EF0	NE of Greeley–Weld County Airport to NE of Lucerne	Weld	CO	40.4512°N 104.6037°W	00:45–00:56	4 mi (6.4 km)	50 yd (46 m)
EF0	This tornado was witnessed by farmers and storm chasers moving through fields. An irrigation pivot system was twisted.						
EF0	NE of Greeley–Weld County Airport to NE of Lucerne	Weld	CO	40.4387°N 104.5924°W	00:46–01:01	4.8 mi (7.7 km)	50 yd (46 m)
EF0	This tornado was witnessed by farmers and storm chasers moving through fields, occurring simultaneously with the previous tornado. A barn and an aluminum shed were damaged.						
EF0	NE of Greeley–Weld County Airport to SE of Eaton	Weld	CO	40.4307°N 104.5813°W	00:56–01:21	8 mi (13 km)	50 yd (46 m)
EF0	This tornado was witnessed by farmers and storm chasers moving through fields, occurring simultaneously with the previous two tornadoes. A barn and an outbuilding were damaged.						
EF0	E of Kersey	Weld	CO	40.3933°N 104.4839°W	01:26–01:30	1.15 mi (1.85 km)	50 yd (46 m)
EF0	A storm chaser reported a brief tornado with no damage.						
EF0	SE of Whatley	Valley	MT	48.16°N 106.49°W	03:17–03:22	0.82 mi (1.32 km)	50 yd (46 m)
EF0	A tree was snapped and a barn had its doors blown in and roof torn off, with roofing scattered 100 yd (91 m) away. A house had part of its metal roof peeled back, and a nearby carport had its roof torn off. An aluminum boat was moved 100 ft (30 m), and another house sustained siding damage.						

=== May 21 event ===
List of confirmed tornadoes – Thursday, May 21, 2020
EF#	Location	County / Parish	State	Start Coord.	Time (UTC)	Path length	Max width
EF0	Belle Glade	Palm Beach	FL	26.6774°N 80.6739°W	18:45–19:00	0.25 mi (0.40 km)	25 yd (23 m)
EF0	A landspout tornado was reported by multiple weather spotters. No damage was found.						
EFU	NNE of Whitelaw	Greeley	KS	38.66°N 101.6°W	19:33	0.01 mi (0.016 km)	50 yd (46 m)
EFU	A storm chaser caught this very brief landspout tornado on photos. No damage was found.						
EF1	NE of Raeford	Hoke	NC	35.0461°N 79.1565°W	19:56–19:57	0.20 mi (0.32 km)	200 yd (180 m)
EF1	Pine trees were snapped or uprooted by this brief tornado.						
EF0	WNW of Johnson	Stanton	KS	37.593°N 101.805°W	20:41–20:42	0.07 mi (0.11 km)	30 yd (27 m)
EF0	A storm chaser reported a landspout tornado. No damage was found.						
EF0	N of Collidge	Hamilton	KS	38.1702°N 101.97°W	21:15–21:17	0.56 mi (0.90 km)	50 yd (46 m)
EF0	This was the first of two twin landspout tornadoes. No damage was found.						
EF0	NNE of Collidge	Hamilton	KS	38.1842°N 101.9609°W	21:15–21:18	0.31 mi (0.50 km)	50 yd (46 m)
EF0	This was the second of two twin landspout tornadoes. No damage was found.						
EFU	S of Granada	Prowers	CO	37.92°N 102.31°W	21:47–21:58	2 mi (3.2 km)	25 yd (23 m)
EFU	A storm chaser reported a tornado. No damage was found.						
EFU	S of Holly	Prowers	CO	38.02°N 102.12°W	22:17–22:25	1 mi (1.6 km)	25 yd (23 m)
EFU	Storm spotters reported a tornado. No damage was found.						
EF0	S of Syracuse	Hamilton	KS	37.84°N 101.75°W	23:06–23:07	0.07 mi (0.11 km)	50 yd (46 m)
EF0	A storm chaser reported a landspout tornado. No damage was found.						
EFU	SW of Lakin	Kearny	KS	37.802°N 101.468°W	00:11–00:24	1.76 mi (2.83 km)	150 yd (140 m)
EFU	A slow-moving, elephant trunk tornado was observed by storm chasers. No damage was found.						

=== May 22 event ===
List of confirmed tornadoes – Friday, May 22, 2020
EF#	Location	County / Parish	State	Start Coord.	Time (UTC)	Path length	Max width
EF1	SE of Blacksburg to NNE of Bethany	Cherokee, York	SC	35.103°N 81.505°W	19:28–19:43	12.74 mi (20.50 km)	200 yd (180 m)
EF1	This tornado occurred within a larger area of downburst winds. Multiple trees were snapped or uprooted along the path.						
EF0	N of Bethany, SC to SE of Gastonia, NC	Gaston	NC	35.164°N 81.286°W	19:44–19:55	8.63 mi (13.89 km)	100 yd (91 m)
EF0	Damage was limited to many uprooted trees, snapped limbs, and minor structural damage.						
EF0	E of Haynesville	Wichita	TX	34.102°N 98.765°W	23:07	0.1 mi (0.16 km)	30 yd (27 m)
EF0	This brief tornado was observed by a storm chaser. No damage was found.						
EFU	S of Barneston	Gage	NE	40.04°N 96.58°W	23:07	0.03 mi (0.048 km)	50 yd (46 m)
EFU	This brief tornado was caught on video. No damage was found.						
EF1	E of Haynesville to W of Burkburnett	Wichita	TX	34.098°N 98.744°W	23:11–23:16	1.7 mi (2.7 km)	150 yd (140 m)
EF1	Several power poles were damaged.						
EF1	W of Burkburnett	Wichita	TX	34.094°N 98.697°W	23:26	0.2 mi (0.32 km)	50 yd (46 m)
EF1	An outbuilding was heavily damaged along with some trees.						
EFU	NE of Shannon to S of Joy	Clay	TX	33.511°N 98.197°W	00:23–00:35	2.5 mi (4.0 km)	100 yd (91 m)
EFU	Multiple storm chasers observed this tornado. No damage was found.						
EF1	SSW of Charlie	Clay	TX	34.058°N 98.365°W	00:27–00:35	2.3 mi (3.7 km)	50 yd (46 m)
EF1	Multiple storm chasers observed this tornado. Utility poles were damaged on FM 1740.						
EFU	NE of Heavener	LeFlore	OK	34.9193°N 94.5491°W	01:55–01:59	1.7 mi (2.7 km)	75 yd (69 m)
EFU	Several storm chasers observed this tornado. It likely did tree damage, but the damage path was in an heavily wooded area inaccessible by road.						
EF1	Bowie	Montague	TX	33.5522°N 97.8672°W	02:10–02:12	1.35 mi (2.17 km)	400 yd (370 m)
EF1	This tornado was embedded within a larger area of straight-line wind damage. A hotel was damaged at the beginning of the path, and multiple buildings in downtown Bowie sustained considerable roof and wall damage. Damage to trees, homes, and vehicles occurred in town as well.						
EFU	NNE of Degnan	Latimer	OK	35.0038°N 95.331°W	02:32–02:33	0.3 mi (0.48 km)	50 yd (46 m)
EFU	Several storm chasers observed this tornado. It likely did tree damage, but the damage path was in an heavily wooded area inaccessible by road.						
EF1	ESE of Talihina	LeFlore	OK	34.7351°N 95.0245°W	02:58–03:02	0.9 mi (1.4 km)	100 yd (91 m)
EF1	Softwood trees were snapped and uprooted north of Highway 63. Hardwood trees were uprooted, and large tree limbs were snapped before the tornado lifted south of U.S. Route 271.						
EF1	NW of Whitesboro	LeFlore	OK	34.7088°N 94.9425°W	03:05–03:14	3 mi (4.8 km)	225 yd (206 m)
EF1	This tornado formed south of Highway 63 where it uprooted trees. A home was damaged, an outbuilding was destroyed, and more trees were uprooted as it moved east-northeast.						
EF1	N of Whitesboro to NW of Lenox	LeFlore	OK	34.7153°N 94.8881°W	03:15–03:22	2.7 mi (4.3 km)	200 yd (180 m)
EF1	This tornado was observed by a storm spotter. Softwood trees were uprooted.						

=== May 23 event ===
List of confirmed tornadoes – Saturday, May 23, 2020
EF#	Location	County / Parish	State	Start Coord.	Time (UTC)	Path length	Max width
EF1	NNE to NE of Morse	Johnson, Cedar	IA	41.7552°N 91.4271°W	17:30–17:49	7.05 mi (11.35 km)	50 yd (46 m)
EF1	This high-end EF1 tornado damaged an outbuilding, a grain bin, and trees. Power poles were downed as well.						
EF1	SW of Mechanicsville to W of Morley	Cedar, Jones	IA	41.8598°N 91.2901°W	17:57–18:13	6.86 mi (11.04 km)	30 yd (27 m)
EF1	A porch was destroyed at a home. A farm outbuilding was also damaged. The damage path was intermittent.						
EF0	SE of Lost Nation	Clinton	IA	41.9423°N 90.8033°W	18:20–18:23	1.19 mi (1.92 km)	20 yd (18 m)
EF0	A brief tornado damaged a metal outbuilding at a farm.						
EF0	S to ESE of Maquoketa	Jackson	IA	42.0472°N 90.6756°W	18:53–18:57	1.45 mi (2.33 km)	20 yd (18 m)
EF0	Brief tornado was caught on video and passed along by emergency management. A few homes near a golf course received shingle damage.						
EF0	Panola	Woodford	IL	40.7742°N 89.0324°W	18:54–18:59	3.46 mi (5.57 km)	75 yd (69 m)
EF0	The roof of an outbuilding was damaged, a window in a house was cracked, and several tree branches were knocked down.						
EFU	NE of Andrew	Jackson	IA	42.17°N 90.5842°W	19:24–19:25	0.04 mi (0.064 km)	10 yd (9.1 m)
EFU	A brief tornado touched down in a field. No damage was observed to determine a rating.						
EF1	NE of Morrison to S of South Elkhorn	Whiteside, Carroll	IL	41.8314°N 89.8794°W	19:29–19:53	12.25 mi (19.71 km)	30 yd (27 m)
EF1	The tornado snapped a tree, caused shingle damage, and downed power lines along an intermittent path.						
EF0	N of Sank Ridge to NW of Birds	Grundy, Kendall, Will	IL	41.4535°N 88.3269°W	19:53–20:07	6.3 mi (10.1 km)	100 yd (91 m)
EF0	A high-end EF0 tornado downed two wooden utility polesand along with numerous trees and tree branches. A car was overturned on I-80, injuring the driver.						
EFU	NE of Warren	Jo Daviess	IL	42.4988°N 89.9785°W	21:18–21:20	0.53 mi (0.85 km)	20 yd (18 m)
EFU	This tornado was spotted in an open field by a trained spotter. No damage was observed to determine a rating.						
EF1	SW of Chana	Ogle	IL	41.9673°N 89.2434°W	21:30–21:32	0.3 mi (0.48 km)	100 yd (91 m)
EF1	This brief tornado caused significant damage to outbuildings at two farmsteads, and downed several trees and power poles.						
EF0	NNW of New Lebanon to NNW of Hampshire	DeKalb, Kane	IL	42.1393°N 88.63°W	23:06–23:16	3.2 mi (5.1 km)	50 yd (46 m)
EF0	A tornado heavily damaged a barn, with debris scattered downwind into a field. Power lines were downed as well.						
EFU	S of Graham Chapel	Garza	TX	32.995°N 101.4639°W	23:14–23:25	0.38 mi (0.61 km)	30 yd (27 m)
EFU	The tornado was widely captured by storm chasers as it remained nearly stationary over open fields. Any damage was inaccessible due to a lack of roads.						
EF0	N of York	Benson	ND	48.34°N 99.57°W	23:52	0.1 mi (0.16 km)	20 yd (18 m)
EF0	A slow-moving landspout briefly touched down.						
EFU	ENE of Kanorado Airport	Sherman	KS	39.4485°N 101.8926°W	00:07–00:10	1.11 mi (1.79 km)	50 yd (46 m)
EFU	A brief landspout touched down. No damage was reported.						

=== May 24 event ===
List of confirmed tornadoes – Sunday, May 24, 2020
EF#	Location	County / Parish	State	Start Coord.	Time (UTC)	Path length	Max width
EF0	N of Oak to NE of Angus	Nuckolls	NE	40.3411°N 97.8549°W	23:26–23:36	3.31 mi (5.33 km)	40 yd (37 m)
EF0	11 empty coal railroad corners were blown of the tracks by this landspout tornado.						
EF1	S of Helotes	Bexar	TX	29.5275°N 98.7046°W	01:11–01:12	0.47 mi (0.76 km)	50 yd (46 m)
EF1	Several homes in a subdivision received substantial roof damage while others had broken windows, large sections of roofing lifted off, and puncture marks from flying debris on exterior walls. A fence was downed near the end of the path.						

=== May 25 event ===
List of confirmed tornadoes – Monday, May 25, 2020
EF#	Location	County / Parish	State	Start Coord.	Time (UTC)	Path length	Max width
EF1	ENE to NW of Aladdin City	Miami-Dade	FL	25.5742°N 80.4518°W	05:30–05:43	4.83 mi (7.77 km)	40 yd (37 m)
EF1	A low-end EF1 tornado tipped over several campers at the Miami Everglades RV Resort. The majority of the remaining damage along its discontinuous path was limited to trees and fencing. The tornado was indirectly associated with the precursor to Tropical Storm Bertha.						
EF0	SSW of Halls	Buchanan	MO	39.61°N 94.99°W	19:30	0.01 mi (0.016 km)	20 yd (18 m)
EF0	A brief tornado produced no reported damage.						
EF1	NNE of Winfield	Titus	TX	33.2226°N 95.082°W	22:05–22:07	0.53 mi (0.85 km)	100 yd (91 m)
EF1	A cattle trailer was flipped multiple times and moved 75–80 yards (69–73 m) to the front yard of a house. The license plate was carried 1.5 miles (2.4 km). Two smaller trailers were also carried 75 yards (69 m) to the same yard and are believed to have knocked down the supports for the front porch of the house. Numerous trees were uprooted and snapped.						
EF0	SW of Blackgum	Sequoyah	OK	35.5982°N 95.0206°W	22:37–22:38	0.5 mi (0.80 km)	100 yd (91 m)
EF0	Brief tornado destroyed boat storage units, blew down power poles and lines, and snapped large tree limbs.						
EF1	Lewisville	Lafayette	AR	33.3682°N 93.5759°W	22:38–22:39	0.3 mi (0.48 km)	40 yd (37 m)
EF1	A brief tornado uprooted and snapped trees and snapped a power pole. One large pine tree fell through a house and onto a church, and another tree fell through a mobile home.						
EFU	SSE of West Hartford	Sebastian	AR	34.9623°N 94.3966°W	22:58–23:00	1.3 mi (2.1 km)	75 yd (69 m)
EFU	A brief tornado traveled through a heavily wooded area and produced a tornado debris signature, but the damaged area was not accessible to a survey.						
EFU	Toledo Bend Reservoir	Sabine	LA	31.5624°N 93.8084°W	23:12–23:18	2.28 mi (3.67 km)	40 yd (37 m)
EFU	A waterspout was caught on video. No damage was found.						
EF1	Johnston	Polk	IA	41.66°N 93.706°W	23:26–23:29	1.56 mi (2.51 km)	50 yd (46 m)
EF1	A brief tornado produced tree and power line damage near a park.						
EF1	N of Watts	Adair	OK	36.1423°N 94.5724°W	00:11–00:13	0.6 mi (0.97 km)	120 yd (110 m)
EF1	A brief tornado was caught on a tower cam in West Siloam Springs, and was observed by storm chasers. Trees were uprooted and large tree limbs were snapped.						
EF0	ENE of Row	Delaware	OK	36.2937°N 94.6122°W	00:34	0.1 mi (0.16 km)	50 yd (46 m)
EF0	A very brief tornado was observed by storm chasers. Large tree limbs were snapped.						
EF1	SSW of Maysville	Delaware	OK	36.3379°N 94.6321°W	00:45–00:46	0.3 mi (0.48 km)	75 yd (69 m)
EF1	Trees were uprooted. This tornado likely had a longer path, but it occurred in a heavily wooded area that was mainly inaccessible by road.						
EF0	SE of Grove	Delaware	OK	36.51°N 94.6476°W	01:13–01:19	2.2 mi (3.5 km)	300 yd (270 m)
EF0	Tree limbs were snapped.						

=== May 26 event ===
List of confirmed tornadoes – Tuesday, May 26, 2020
EF#	Location	County / Parish	State	Start Coord.	Time (UTC)	Path length	Max width
EF0	Waukee	Dallas	IA	41.6119°N 93.8862°W	18:18–18:20	0.95 mi (1.53 km)	40 yd (37 m)
EF0	A church and a car dealership suffered minor damage and a house under construction lost shingles.						
EFU	E of Dallas Center	Dallas	IA	41.6618°N 93.9146°W	18:28–18:31	1.69 mi (2.72 km)	30 yd (27 m)
EFU	Numerous videos show a tornado on rural land. It did not hit any damage indicators.						
EFU	SE of Berkley	Boone	IA	41.8964°N 94.0606°W	19:04–19:05	0.6 mi (0.97 km)	20 yd (18 m)
EFU	A storm chaser observed a brief tornado, which did not hit any damage indicators.						
EFU	E of Ogden	Boone	IA	42.0236°N 93.9867°W	19:22–19:23	0.21 mi (0.34 km)	20 yd (18 m)
EFU	A storm chaser observed a very brief tornado, which did not hit any damage indicators.						
EF1	WSW of Woolstock to S of Eagle Grove	Wright	IA	42.5622°N 93.8903°W	20:38–20:44	5.14 mi (8.27 km)	250 yd (230 m)
EF1	The tornado caused significant tree damage and destroyed a large machine shed.						
EFU	N of Adair	Guthrie	IA	41.5313°N 94.636°W	20:53–20:58	2.94 mi (4.73 km)	35 yd (32 m)
EFU	The tornado had an intermittent path and did not hit any damage indicators.						
EFU	E of North Branch	Guthrie	IA	41.6407°N 94.6467°W	21:16–21:17	0.66 mi (1.06 km)	20 yd (18 m)
EFU	A brief tornado did not hit any damage indicators.						
EF0	NE of Rosemount	Dakota	MN	44.7455°N 93.1139°W	00:15–00:16	0.26 mi (0.42 km)	25 yd (23 m)
EF0	A brief tornado blew down a few trees.						
EF0	SE of Oakland	Freeborn	MN	43.6501°N 93.0624°W	00:25–00:28	0.55 mi (0.89 km)	50 yd (46 m)
EF0	A brief tornado, caught on video, produced a debris cloud and blew down a few trees.						

=== May 27 event ===
NC event is associated with Tropical Storm Bertha.

List of confirmed tornadoes – Wednesday, May 27, 2020
EF#	Location	County / Parish	State	Start Coord.	Time (UTC)	Path length	Max width
EF1	N of Howth	Waller	TX	30.2095°N 96.084°W	20:21–20:23	0.8 mi (1.3 km)	50 yd (46 m)
EF1	Numerous trees were uprooted and laid down in different directions.						
EF1	NE of Howth	Waller	TX	30.2073°N 96.0562°W	20:23–20:25	1.45 mi (2.33 km)	75 yd (69 m)
EF1	Numerous trees were uprooted or snapped, and a roof was taken off a barn.						
EF0	Pasadena	Harris	TX	29.7054°N 95.1868°W	21:50–21:53	1.75 mi (2.82 km)	50 yd (46 m)
EF0	Numerous trees were downed. Fences and carports were damaged.						
EF0	SSE of Paschall	Warren	NC	36.5154°N 78.1622°W	23:08–23:09	0.17 mi (0.27 km)	150 yd (140 m)
EF0	A brief tornado spawned by the remnants of Tropical Storm Bertha destroyed an outbuilding and uprooted and snapped numerous trees.						
EFU	WSW of Posey	Clinton	IL	38.519°N 89.3876°W	00:34–00:35	0.07 mi (0.11 km)	10 yd (9.1 m)
EFU	Several individuals observed a tornado. No damage was reported.						

=== May 28 event ===
List of confirmed tornadoes – Thursday, May 28, 2020
EF#	Location	County / Parish	State	Start Coord.	Time (UTC)	Path length	Max width
EFU	Edelstein	Peoria	IL	40.9275°N 89.6348°W	21:10–21:15	1.69 mi (2.72 km)	25 yd (23 m)
EFU	A landspout touched down in an open field and produced no damage.						
EFU	NNE of Barnett to S of Wagonner	Montgomery	IL	39.3127°N 89.6706°W	22:50–22:55	2.88 mi (4.63 km)	100 yd (91 m)
EFU	A landspout was captured in pictures and video.						
EF0	ENE of Prue	Osage	OK	36.2497°N 96.2634°W	23:56	0.1 mi (0.16 km)	50 yd (46 m)
EF0	A mobile home and outbuilding were damaged, a carport was destroyed, and large tree limbs were snapped.						
EFU	NNE of Bethany	Moultrie	IL	39.6828°N 88.7211°W	00:25–00:26	0.36 mi (0.58 km)	20 yd (18 m)
EFU	A landspout briefly touched down. No damage was reported.						
EFU	E of Ullrich	Moultrie	IL	39.7314°N 88.6628°W	00:34–00:35	0.31 mi (0.50 km)	20 yd (18 m)
EFU	A landspout briefly touched down. No damage was reported.						

=== May 29 event ===
List of confirmed tornadoes – Friday, May 29, 2020
EF#	Location	County / Parish	State	Start Coord.	Time (UTC)	Path length	Max width
EF1	SSW of Hartman to Glens Falls	Warren, Saratoga	NY	43.242°N 73.784°W	21:52–22:05	8.58 mi (13.81 km)	433 yd (396 m)
EF1	Numerous hardwood and softwood trees were sheared off and uprooted. One home had damage to its roof.						

=== May 30 event ===
List of confirmed tornadoes – Saturday, May 30, 2020
EF#	Location	County / Parish	State	Start Coord.	Time (UTC)	Path length	Max width
EFU	NNW of Millhaven	Screven	GA	32.948°N 81.6385°W	17:30–17:40	0.05 mi (0.080 km)	30 yd (27 m)
EFU	A landspout touched down in a field. No damage was reported.						

== June ==
Confirmed tornadoes by Enhanced Fujita rating
EFU	EF0	EF1	EF2	EF3	EF4	EF5	Total
19	51	22	0	0	0	0	92

=== June 1 event ===
List of confirmed tornadoes – Monday, June 1, 2020
EF#	Location	County / Parish	State	Start Coord.	Time (UTC)	Path length	Max width
EF0	Nokomis	Sarasota	FL	27.1077°N 82.4161°W	21:39–21:43	0.62 mi (1.00 km)	75 yd (69 m)
EF0	A dugout had its roof torn off. The tornado also damaged goalposts, fences, trees, and the roof of a nearby strip mall.						

=== June 2 event ===
List of confirmed tornadoes – Tuesday, June 2, 2020
EF#	Location	County / Parish	State	Start Coord.	Time (UTC)	Path length	Max width
EFU	N of Wild Horse	Cheyenne	CO	39.00°N 102.95°W	19:13–19:16	0.54 mi (0.87 km)	30 yd (27 m)
EFU	A brief landspout tornado was observed by an NWS employee and an online webcam.						
EFU	NNE of Wild Horse	Cheyenne	CO	38.988°N 102.9446°W	19:27–19:31	1.09 mi (1.75 km)	30 yd (27 m)
EFU	A brief landspout tornado was observed by a NWS employee and an online webcam.						
EFU	NNE of Wild Horse	Cheyenne	CO	38.9732°N 102.9573°W	19:31–19:34	0.07 mi (0.11 km)	30 yd (27 m)
EFU	A brief landspout tornado was observed by a NWS employee and an online webcam. This landspout formed as the second landspout was dissipating.						
EFU	NNW of Firstview	Kit Carson	CO	39.0537°N 102.5977°W	19:52–19:55	0.48 mi (0.77 km)	30 yd (27 m)
EFU	A brief landspout tornado was observed by an online webcam.						
EFU	SSE of Burlington	Kit Carson	CO	39.149°N 102.1831°W	20:14–20:17	1.11 mi (1.79 km)	30 yd (27 m)
EFU	A brief landspout tornado was observed from an agricultural building.						
EFU	S of Sharon Springs	Wallace	KS	38.8031°N 101.7521°W	21:02–21:05	0.57 mi (0.92 km)	30 yd (27 m)
EFU	A brief landspout tornado was observed.						

=== June 4 event ===
List of confirmed tornadoes – Thursday, June 4, 2020
EF#	Location	County / Parish	State	Start Coord.	Time (UTC)	Path length	Max width
EF0	W of Blue Springs to Lake Latawana	Jackson	MO	39.0036°N 94.3240°W	07:20–07:33	5.69 mi (9.16 km)	40 yd (37 m)
EF0	Tree branches were snapped and trees were uprooted. One home received minor roof damage.						
EF0	Archie	Cass, Bates	MO	38.4832°N 94.3474°W	07:56–08:00	1.78 mi (2.86 km)	40 yd (37 m)
EF0	A large tree fell on a house in Archie before the tornado moved southeast into Bates County and dissipated.						
EF0	NE of Trenton	Gibson	TN	36.0073°N 88.9216°W	22:44–22:49	1.91 mi (3.07 km)	60 yd (55 m)
EF0	Trees were downed.						
EFU	N of Colfer	Dundy	NE	40.091°N 101.8697°W	22:45–22:46	0.82 mi (1.32 km)	30 yd (27 m)
EFU	A very brief landspout was on the ground for about 30 seconds before dissipating.						
EF0	WNW of Clarksburg to SW of Holladay	Carroll	TN	35.9042°N 88.4728°W	23:51–00:20	15.08 mi (24.27 km)	90 yd (82 m)
EF0	Trees were downed along an intermittent path.						

=== June 6 event ===
Florida events associated with Tropical Storm Cristobal.

List of confirmed tornadoes – Saturday, June 6, 2020
EF#	Location	County / Parish	State	Start Coord.	Time (UTC)	Path length	Max width
EF1	SW of Arlington	Carbon	WY	41.4594°N 106.4015°W	20:51–20:57	1.21 mi (1.95 km)	600 yd (550 m)
EF1	Trees were snapped or uprooted.						
EF0	SE of Webster	Sumter	FL	28.57°N 82.01°W	21:53–21:58	0.25 mi (0.40 km)	75 yd (69 m)
EF0	Trained spotter reported a brief tornado picking up dirt near Highway 50.						
EF0	WNW of Clearwater	Pinellas	FL	27.9783°N 82.77°W	21:59–22:04	0.91 mi (1.46 km)	75 yd (69 m)
EF0	Trees fell on vehicles, and a garage wall was pushed inward.						
EF0	N of Oak Ridge	Orange	FL	28.5001°N 81.4361°W	22:07	0.01 mi (0.016 km)	10 yd (9.1 m)
EF0	A landspout tornado was confirmed by video near Interstate 4 and The Mall at Millenia.						
EF0	W of Oxford	Sumter	FL	28.93°N 82.08°W	22:20–22:25	0.51 mi (0.82 km)	75 yd (69 m)
EF0	A barn, and the roof a home was damaged.						
EF0	WNW of Sky Lake	Orange	FL	28.4634°N 81.4074°W	22:40	0.01 mi (0.016 km)	20 yd (18 m)
EF0	A very brief landspout tornado was observed by a trained spotter near Lake Ellenor. It lasted for about 30 to 45 seconds before dissipating. No damage occurred.						
EF1	SW of Conway to W of Azalea Park	Orange	FL	28.4701°N 81.3559°W	23:20–23:32	5.12 mi (8.24 km)	500 yd (460 m)
EF1	A waterspout, spawned from the outer rainbands of Tropical Storm Cristobal, touched down over Lake Conway in Belle Isle, briefly moving across an isthmus, then across Little Lake Conway. A lakefront home along the isthmus suffered severe roof damage, and numerous trees were downed. Traveling nearly due north, it moved onshore near Conway and ultimately dissipated just east of Downtown Orlando. Several apartment homes lost large portions of their roofs in Conway. Damage elsewhere was primarily limited to trees. Across the city of Orlando, 27 homes were damaged: 2 severely, 14 moderately, and 11 minimally.						
EF0	ESE of Debary	Volusia	FL	28.8387°N 81.2614°W	00:27–00:34	2 mi (3.2 km)	200 yd (180 m)
EF0	A trained spotter reported a large waterspout over Lake Monroe, which briefly came onshore. Only minor tree damage occurred on the lakeshore.						

=== June 7 event ===
Florida events associated with Tropical Storm Cristobal.

List of confirmed tornadoes – Sunday, June 7, 2020
EF#	Location	County / Parish	State	Start Coord.	Time (UTC)	Path length	Max width
EF0	NE of Columbia	Columbia	FL	30.087°N 82.6754°W	19:30–19:35	1.43 mi (2.30 km)	100 yd (91 m)
EF0	A tornado snapped or uprooted many trees and damaged a barn.						
EF0	SE of Emeralda	Lake	FL	28.8984°N 81.8119°W	19:40	0.01 mi (0.016 km)	25 yd (23 m)
EF0	A brief tornado was photographed and videoed by residents.						
EF0	ENE of Worthington Springs	Union	FL	29.9394°N 82.3885°W	20:05	0.01 mi (0.016 km)	25 yd (23 m)
EF0	A brief tornado damaged one home.						
EF0	ESE of Tavares	Lake	FL	28.7914°N 81.704°W	22:41–22:42	0.5 mi (0.80 km)	20 yd (18 m)
EF0	A waterspout developed over Lake Dora. As it came onshore briefly, it knocked down a power pole and a transformer. It dissipated very quickly afterward.						
EF1	NW of Highmore	Hyde	SD	44.7771°N 99.5698°W	23:05–23:07	0.36 mi (0.58 km)	50 yd (46 m)
EF1	A machine shed was destroyed, with debris tossed 100 ft (30 m), a long barn had much of its roof torn off, a livestock trailer was tipped over, and a barn had its doors blown in. Several trees were snapped in the area.						
EF1	SW of Faulkton	Faulk	SD	44.9110°N 99.4527°W	23:17–23:20	0.99 mi (1.59 km)	70 yd (64 m)
EF1	A tornado damaged several structures and several sheds were pushed or rolled over. One shed was lofted above a grove of trees. Several trees were snapped at their trunks.						
EF1	W of Faulkton	Faulk	SD	45.0408°N 99.3989°W	23:25–23:30	0.65 mi (1.05 km)	150 yd (140 m)
EF1	Three outbuildings were destroyed and debris was strewn up to 0.75 mi (1.21 km) away. One had its anchoring poles pulled straight from the ground and another well-anchored shed was torn off its foundation. A nearby home sustained minor damage to its roof and siding.						
EFU	WNW of Ashley	McIntosh	ND	46.0404°N 99.4196°W	23:45–23:46	0.2 mi (0.32 km)	30 yd (27 m)
EFU	A brief tornado touched down in an open field. No damage occurred.						
EFU	SW of Kulm	Dickey	ND	46.26°N 98.98°W	00:20–00:21	0.42 mi (0.68 km)	30 yd (27 m)
EFU	A brief tornado touched down in an open field. No damage occurred.						
EF0	WSW of Fredrick	Brown	SD	45.7796°N 98.6655°W	01:30–01:35	5.35 mi (8.61 km)	50 yd (46 m)
EF0	Tree branches were thrown about 0.25 mi (400 m) across an open field. A tree was uprooted, and two calving sheds were destroyed. Debris from the sheds were also thrown about 0.25 mi (400 m) across an open field. Several more trees were downed before the tornado lifted.						
EF0	S of Lakota	Nelson	ND	47.97°N 98.35°W	01:52	0.1 mi (0.16 km)	50 yd (46 m)
EF0	Law enforcement confirmed a brief tornado in an open field. No damage occurred.						

=== June 8 event ===
List of confirmed tornadoes – Monday, June 8, 2020
EF#	Location	County / Parish	State	Start Coord.	Time (UTC)	Path length	Max width
EF0	S of Sharon	Steele	ND	47.57°N 97.9°W	21:17	0.1 mi (0.16 km)	50 yd (46 m)
EF0	A brief tornado was caught on video. No damage occurred.						
EF1	N of Sharon to NE of Aneta	Steele, Grand Forks	ND	47.65°N 97.90°W	21:30–21:42	7 mi (11 km)	250 yd (230 m)
EF1	A shed lost its back wall, and sheathing was torn off a building. Pine and cottonwood trees were snapped or uprooted.						
EF0	S to SE of Arvilla	Grand Forks	ND	47.85°N 97.49°W	22:09–22:15	3 mi (4.8 km)	150 yd (140 m)
EF0	Poplar and cottonwood trees were snapped.						
EF0	NNE of Arnold	Custer	NE	41.52°N 100.14°W	23:48–23:50	0.01 mi (0.016 km)	10 yd (9.1 m)
EF0	A brief tornado was reported, but no damage was found.						
EF1	S to E of Middle River	Marshall	MN	48.38°N 96.16°W	00:17–00:32	9 mi (14 km)	300 yd (270 m)
EF1	Numerous poplar and pine trees were snapped. This tornado was recorded by at least two chase teams.						
EF0	NE of Maxwell	Lincoln	NE	41.23°N 100.37°W	00:26–00:27	0.01 mi (0.016 km)	10 yd (9.1 m)
EF0	A brief tornado was reported, but no damage was found.						
EF0	NNW of Milburn	Blaine	NE	41.77°N 99.78°W	00:46–00:47	0.01 mi (0.016 km)	10 yd (9.1 m)
EF0	A brief tornado was reported, but no damage was found.						
EF0	S of Arnold	Custer	NE	41.38°N 100.19°W	00:53–00:54	0.01 mi (0.016 km)	10 yd (9.1 m)
EF0	A brief tornado was reported, but no damage was found.						
EF0	W of Merna	Custer	NE	41.48°N 99.92°W	01:20–01:24	0.01 mi (0.016 km)	10 yd (9.1 m)
EF0	A brief tornado was reported, but no damage was found.						
EF1	ESE of Winner	Lake of the Woods	MN	48.58°N 95.27°W	01:45–01:50	1.2 mi (1.9 km)	100 yd (91 m)
EF1	Fir and pine trees were uprooted. Large diameter ash and poplar trees were snapped.						
EFU	E of Carthage	Miner	SD	44.1714°N 97.5624°W	04:34–04:35	0.01 mi (0.016 km)	5 yd (4.6 m)
EFU	A brief tornado was observed by a storm spotter. No damage occurred.						

=== June 9 event ===
Illinois and Ohio event associated with Tropical Storm Cristobal.

List of confirmed tornadoes – Tuesday, June 9, 2020
EF#	Location	County / Parish	State	Start Coord.	Time (UTC)	Path length	Max width
EF0	N of Danube	Renville	MN	44.8795°N 95.1011°W	22:35–22:38	0.33 mi (0.53 km)	25 yd (23 m)
EF0	A brief tornado was caught on video. Large tree branches were snapped.						
EFU	NW of Fairbury	Jefferson	NE	40.16°N 97.23°W	23:03	0.1 mi (0.16 km)	1 yd (0.91 m)
EFU	A brief tornado was reported by media. No damage was found.						
EFU	SSE of Piper City to WSW of Gilman	Ford, Iroquois	IL	40.6997°N 88.1472°W	23:24–23:28	4.36 mi (7.02 km)	75 yd (69 m)
EFU	A tornado was confirmed by storm spotters. No known damage occurred.						
EFU	NNW of Vermillion	Marshall	KS	39.79°N 96.29°W	23:26–23:27	0.01 mi (0.016 km)	10 yd (9.1 m)
EFU	A brief dust whirl was observed by a storm spotter underneath a funnel cloud. No damage occurred.						
EF0	S of Covington	Miami	OH	40.0774°N 84.354°W	00:32–00:33	0.5 mi (0.80 km)	75 yd (69 m)
EF0	Minor damage occurred to trees just west of OH-48.						
EF0	N of Oregon	Holt	MO	40.0401°N 95.1604°W	01:03	0.01 mi (0.016 km)	25 yd (23 m)
EF0	A brief tornado was caught on video and photos near I-29. No damage was found.						

=== June 10 event ===
List of confirmed tornadoes – Wednesday, June 10, 2020
EF#	Location	County / Parish	State	Start Coord.	Time (UTC)	Path length	Max width
EF0	N of Chillicothe	Ross	OH	39.3786°N 83.0791°W	22:18–22:24	5.9 mi (9.5 km)	300 yd (270 m)
EF0	A weak tornado embedded within 2–3 mile swath of strong straight-line winds damaged several barns, outbuildings, and trees.						
EF0	W of Gray Court	Laurens	SC	34.602°N 82.189°W	00:29–00:30	0.41 mi (0.66 km)	30 yd (27 m)
EF0	A brief tornado was observed by the public as it damaged a carport and uprooted several trees. It also caused minor damage to an old barn and several homes.						
EF0	Hanoverton	Columbiana	OH	40.744°N 80.912°W	01:11–01:14	2.43 mi (3.91 km)	150 yd (140 m)
EF0	Several trees were snapped or uprooted, and several additional large limbs had been snapped. Also here, sheet metal roofing from a barn was removed, and two 3000 lb hay wagons were relocated upwind of their prior location. Minor fascia damage occurred.						
EF0	Leetonia to Washingtonville	Columbiana	OH	40.891°N 80.768°W	01:24–01:27	0.75 mi (1.21 km)	75 yd (69 m)
EF0	Numerous trees were snapped or uprooted. Minor fascia damage occurred.						
EF1	Ohioville to Daugherty Township	Beaver	PA	40.68°N 80.44°W	01:31–01:43	9.6 mi (15.4 km)	790 yd (720 m)
EF1	Numerous trees were snapped or uprooted, and five power poles were snapped as well. The tornado was initially rated EF2, but was downgraded to EF1 in the final report.						

=== June 13 event ===
List of confirmed tornadoes – Saturday, June 13, 2020
EF#	Location	County / Parish	State	Start Coord.	Time (UTC)	Path length	Max width
EF0	Damascus	Clackamas	OR	45.41°N 122.47°W	01:28–01:39	2 mi (3.2 km)	200 yd (180 m)
EF0	Five trees were downed, one of which significantly damaged a few parked vehicles.						

=== June 17 event ===
List of confirmed tornadoes – Wednesday, June 17, 2020
EF#	Location	County / Parish	State	Start Coord.	Time (UTC)	Path length	Max width
EF1	SW of Greenbush	Roseau	MN	48.65°N 96.26°W	22:33–22:37	2.03 mi (3.27 km)	300 yd (270 m)
EF1	Multiple trees and tree branches were snapped.						
EF0	NE of Warren	Marshall	MN	48.23°N 96.72°W	01:42–01:44	0.92 mi (1.48 km)	75 yd (69 m)
EF0	Multiple trees were snapped.						
EF1	S of Florian	Marshall	MN	48.39°N 96.65°W	01:49–01:56	3.8 mi (6.1 km)	400 yd (370 m)
EF1	Multiple trees were snapped along the path.						
EF1	W of Pinecreek	Roseau	MN	48.98°N 95.99°W	02:10–02:12	1.09 mi (1.75 km)	200 yd (180 m)
EF1	This tornado tracked through parts of Dieter and Ross Townships. A pole shed was destroyed, with its debris being thrown as far as 1 mi (1.6 km) away. Multiple trees were snapped.						

=== June 18 event ===
List of confirmed tornadoes – Thursday, June 18, 2020
EF#	Location	County / Parish	State	Start Coord.	Time (UTC)	Path length	Max width
EFU	WNW of German Valley	Kossuth	IA	43.3138°N 94.1028°W	23:37–23:38	0.72 mi (1.16 km)	30 yd (27 m)
EFU	A brief tornado was caught on video and photos. No damage was found.						

=== June 19 event ===
List of confirmed tornadoes – Friday, June 19, 2020
EF#	Location	County / Parish	State	Start Coord.	Time (UTC)	Path length	Max width
EF0	W of Groom	Carson	TX	35.1989°N 101.1641°W	22:40–22:42	0.71 mi (1.14 km)	50 yd (46 m)
EF0	A landspout tornado was observed by a storm chaser. It crossed I-40 before dissipating. No damage was found.						
EF0	WSW of Groom	Carson	TX	35.19°N 101.1599°W	22:42–22:43	0.43 mi (0.69 km)	50 yd (46 m)
EF0	A second landspout tornado was observed by a storm chaser. No damage was found.						

=== June 20 event ===
List of confirmed tornadoes – Saturday, June 20, 2020
EF#	Location	County / Parish	State	Start Coord.	Time (UTC)	Path length	Max width
EF0	N of Butte Des Morts	Winnebago	WI	44.1097°N 88.6526°W	22:01–22:02	0.24 mi (0.39 km)	50 yd (46 m)
EF0	A brief tornado was observed by the Oshkosh Fire Department. No damage was found.						
EF0	Lake Butte des Morts	Winnebago	WI	44.0848°N 88.6582°W	22:23–22:27	1.07 mi (1.72 km)	75 yd (69 m)
EF0	A storm chaser and the public spotted a waterspout over Lake Butte des Morts. The waterspout dissipated before making landfall.						
EFU	ENE of Ellendale	Dickey	ND	46.02°N 98.45°W	22:25–22:26	0.27 mi (0.43 km)	30 yd (27 m)
EFU	An emergency manager reported a tornado. No damage was found.						
EF0	NNW of Dunning	Blaine	NE	42.01°N 100.21°W	22:25–22:30	0.01 mi (0.016 km)	10 yd (9.1 m)
EF0	A tornado was photographed. No damage was reported.						
EF0	Lake Winnebago	Winnebago	WI	43.9139°N 88.4666°W	22:35–22:41	3.37 mi (5.42 km)	75 yd (69 m)
EF0	Multiple people observed a waterspout over Lake Winnebago. The waterspout dissipated before making landfall.						
EF0	ESE of Turton	Spink	SD	45.0405°N 98.0404°W	01:09–01:10	0.18 mi (0.29 km)	10 yd (9.1 m)
EF0	A storm chaser reported a tornado. No damage was found.						

=== June 21 event ===
List of confirmed tornadoes – Sunday, June 21, 2020
EF#	Location	County / Parish	State	Start Coord.	Time (UTC)	Path length	Max width
EF0	NNE of Hoxie to WSW of Lucerne	Sheridan	KS	39.4474°N 100.3966°W	19:50–20:10	5.82 mi (9.37 km)	100 yd (91 m)
EF0	A center pivot was overturned in a field. This was a landspout tornado with multiple confirmed reports.						

=== June 22 event ===
List of confirmed tornadoes – Monday, June 22, 2020
EF#	Location	County / Parish	State	Start Coord.	Time (UTC)	Path length	Max width
EF0	WNW of Dawn	Deaf Smith	TX	34.946°N 102.3314°W	01:30–01:35	1.29 mi (2.08 km)	25 yd (23 m)
EF0	A storm chaser reported a tornado. No damage occurred.						

=== June 24 event ===
List of confirmed tornadoes – Wednesday, June 24, 2020
EF#	Location	County / Parish	State	Start Coord.	Time (UTC)	Path length	Max width
EF1	Westminster	East Baton Rouge	LA	30.4049°N 91.1005°W	10:50–10:55	3.54 mi (5.70 km)	100 yd (91 m)
EF1	Near the beginning of the path, an inn had minor roof damage, small trees were snapped, and a light pole was knocked over. The tornado quickly intensified moments later, ripping off roofing, downing fencing, and blowing out windows. A vehicle was pushed by the tornado from a parking lot, through chain link fencing, and onto an I-10 on-ramp. After crossing the interstate, the tornado passed over an elementary school, damaging the school's sign and ripping skirting off modular classrooms. The tornado produced minor damage near I-12 before lifting.						
EF1	NE of Central	East Baton Rouge	LA	30.6017°N 91.005°W	11:25–11:28	0.33 mi (0.53 km)	125 yd (114 m)
EF1	Trees were snapped or uprooted, including some that landed on two cars. A carport, and fascia of some nearby homes were damaged.						
EF1	S of Salem to SSE of Darbun	Walthall, Marion	MS	31.1971°N 90.1248°W	12:20–12:37	6.53 mi (10.51 km)	150 yd (140 m)
EF1	Trees were snapped or uprooted. A home had minor roof damage, and a power pole was taken down.						
EF0	Gulfport	Harrison	MS	30.3679°N 89.0857°W	17:27–17:32	0.73 mi (1.17 km)	40 yd (37 m)
EF0	Several large hardwood trees were snapped in Gulfport. Some homes had minor roof damage as well.						
EF1	NE of Wool Market	Harrison	MS	30.5075°N 88.9405°W	17:34–17:36	0.25 mi (0.40 km)	50 yd (46 m)
EF1	A large hardwood tree was snapped, and several pine trees were twisted and snapped.						
EF1	NW of Latimer	Harrison	MS	30.5247°N 88.9177°W	17:40–17:44	0.39 mi (0.63 km)	70 yd (64 m)
EF1	Some homes had roof damage. Many trees were violently twisted, and a power pole was snapped at its base.						
EF0	NNE of Big Point	Jackson	MS	30.5977°N 88.4801°W	17:58–17:59	0.19 mi (0.31 km)	20 yd (18 m)
EF0	Some tree limbs were snapped, and pool liner was lifted. Both were found 40 yd (37 m) away.						
EF1	E of Ramsey Springs	George	MS	30.7560°N 88.8579°W	18:00–18:03	1.27 mi (2.04 km)	50 yd (46 m)
EF1	Numerous pine trees were snapped.						
EF0	W of Agricola	George	MS	30.8105°N 88.5751°W	18:19–18:21	0.98 mi (1.58 km)	50 yd (46 m)
EF0	Some tree tops were damaged in a pasture. Trees were uprooted, and minor damage occurred to the metal roof of a house, with additional metal roofing ripped off a shed.						
EF1	SE of Agricola	George	MS	30.7910°N 88.5151°W	18:22–18:24	0.89 mi (1.43 km)	50 yd (46 m)
EF1	Trees were snapped or uprooted, including one which fell on an outbuilding, destroying it. Another outbuilding was destroyed, and a mobile home was damaged. The roof of a home was damaged, and several metal panels were torn from an outbuilding.						
EF0	NE of Mobile Regional Airport	Mobile	AL	30.7059°N 88.2177°W	18:39–18:40	0.28 mi (0.45 km)	50 yd (46 m)
EF0	Damage was very sporadic, with mainly branches of softwood trees damaged.						
EF1	NE of Chunchula	Mobile	AL	30.9817°N 88.1666°W	18:49–18:54	2.66 mi (4.28 km)	300 yd (270 m)
EF1	Softwood trees were snapped, a few of which fell onto several homes, causing significant damage. Another home on the edge of the tornado's path had roof damage.						
EF0	NE of Erwinville	West Baton Rouge	LA	30.6004°N 91.3524°W	19:30–19:35	0.7 mi (1.1 km)	75 yd (69 m)
EF0	A home lost some siding, the roof of an outdoor garage was damaged from a fallen tree, and other trees were snapped or uprooted.						

=== June 26 event ===
List of confirmed tornadoes – Friday, June 26, 2020
EF#	Location	County / Parish	State	Start Coord.	Time (UTC)	Path length	Max width
EF0	Sarasota	Sarasota	FL	27.24°N 82.44°W	23:45–23:50	0.4 mi (0.64 km)	75 yd (69 m)
EF0	Broadcast media relayed photos of a tornado in Sarasota.						

=== June 27 event ===
List of confirmed tornadoes – Saturday, June 27, 2020
EF#	Location	County / Parish	State	Start Coord.	Time (UTC)	Path length	Max width
EF0	WNW of Cuba	Crawford	MO	38.087°N 91.457°W	22:42–22:44	0.76 mi (1.22 km)	100 yd (91 m)
EF0	This tornado touched down on the western side of Indian Lake. A home had minor roof damage. A second home lost the majority of its roof, and a boat dock was flipped. The tornado then crossed Indian Lake. On the eastern side of the lake, some trees were snapped and a home had minor roof damage.						
EF1	NE of Leadington	St. Francois	MO	37.850°N 90.461°W	02:14–02:16	0.74 mi (1.19 km)	125 yd (114 m)
EF1	This tornado initially caused sporadic damage to a grove of trees. It then both strengthened and widened to its max strength and width, causing the southward facing wall of a home to collapse. Minor damage occurred to another home. Some trees were snapped.						

=== June 28 event ===
List of confirmed tornadoes – Sunday, June 28, 2020
EF#	Location	County / Parish	State	Start Coord.	Time (UTC)	Path length	Max width
EFU	WSW of Breien	Morton	ND	46.35°N 101.03°W	01:27–01:39	1.26 mi (2.03 km)	100 yd (91 m)
EFU	The public reported a tornado. No damage was found.						
EF0	NE of Lewiston to SW of Stockton	Winona	MN	44.0015°N 91.8063°W	01:37–01:42	0.72 mi (1.16 km)	25 yd (23 m)
EF0	A brief tornado touched down, causing no known damage.						
EF0	NE of Stockton	Winona	MN	44.0318°N 91.7238°W	01:54–01:56	0.61 mi (0.98 km)	20 yd (18 m)
EF0	Some trees had minor damage.						
EFU	NE of Carbury	Bottineau	ND	48.93°N 100.45°W	02:00–02:02	0.39 mi (0.63 km)	50 yd (46 m)
EFU	The public reported a tornado. No damage was found.						
EF1	NE of Carbury	Bottineau	ND	48.9261°N 100.4515°W	02:05–02:10	1 mi (1.6 km)	100 yd (91 m)
EF1	The roof and a door of a barn were torn off, a machine shed and a carport was damaged, and a swing set was blown away. Trees were snapped or uprooted.						

== July ==
Confirmed tornadoes by Enhanced Fujita rating
EFU	EF0	EF1	EF2	EF3	EF4	EF5	Total
21	54	18	4	0	1	0	98

=== July 1 event ===
List of confirmed tornadoes – Wednesday, July 1, 2020
EF#	Location	County / Parish	State	Start Coord.	Time (UTC)	Path length	Max width
EF0	ENE of Marmaduke	Clay	AR	36.2022°N 90.3137°W	17:50–17:51	0.05 mi (0.080 km)	25 yd (23 m)
EF0	A brief landspout tornado touched down, producing no damage.						
EF1	NW of Kismet	Seward	KS	37.3238°N 100.9475°W	00:33–00:52	6.2 mi (10.0 km)	100 yd (91 m)
EF1	Pivot irrigation sprinklers, power poles, and crops were damaged. The tornado was unusual as the storm formed in area where rain was not even forecasted.						

=== July 2 event ===
List of confirmed tornadoes – Thursday, July 2, 2020
EF#	Location	County / Parish	State	Start Coord.	Time (UTC)	Path length	Max width
EF0	W of Elba	Washington	CO	39.91°N 103.25°W	18:46–18:47	0.01 mi (0.016 km)	50 yd (46 m)
EF0	A brief tornado touched down, producing no damage.						
EF0	SE of Lindon	Washington	CO	39.68°N 103.34°W	19:29–19:30	0.01 mi (0.016 km)	50 yd (46 m)
EF0	A brief tornado touched down, producing no damage.						
EF0	ENE of Anton	Washington	CO	39.79°N 103.11°W	19:46–19:47	0.01 mi (0.016 km)	50 yd (46 m)
EF0	A brief tornado touched down, producing no damage.						
EF0	SE of Arickaree	Washington	CO	39.62°N 103.01°W	20:19–20:20	0.01 mi (0.016 km)	50 yd (46 m)
EF0	A brief tornado touched down, producing no damage.						
EF0	SW of Midway	Washington	CO	40.22°N 103.41°W	20:24–20:25	0.01 mi (0.016 km)	50 yd (46 m)
EF0	A brief tornado touched down, producing no damage.						
EFU	N of Vona	Kit Carson	CO	39.5486°N 102.7615°W	20:40–20:41	0.49 mi (0.79 km)	30 yd (27 m)
EFU	A brief landspout tornado was observed by a storm chaser.						
EFU	ESE of Vona	Kit Carson	CO	39.2671°N 102.684°W	22:30–22:32	0.62 mi (1.00 km)	30 yd (27 m)
EFU	A brief landspout tornado was observed near I-70.						
EF2	ENE of Marsland	Dawes	NE	42.45°N 103.25°W	23:30–23:39	3.4 mi (5.5 km)	250 yd (230 m)
EF2	A tractor tire was thrown several hundred yards, several trees were snapped or uprooted, a center pivot sprinkler was severely mangled, and three steel power poles were bent at their bases.						

=== July 4 event ===
List of confirmed tornadoes – Saturday, July 4, 2020
EF#	Location	County / Parish	State	Start Coord.	Time (UTC)	Path length	Max width
EF0	N of Sofia	Union	NM	36.59°N 103.85°W	22:30–22:32	0.04 mi (0.064 km)	30 yd (27 m)
EF0	A brief tornado was observed over rural countryside.						
EF0	WSW of Gatzke	Marshall	MN	48.42°N 95.83°W	23:30–23:31	0.1 mi (0.16 km)	25 yd (23 m)
EF0	A brief tornado touched down.						
EFU	S of Van Petten	Lee	IL	41.6103°N 89.6091°W	00:02–00:03	0.1 mi (0.16 km)	25 yd (23 m)
EFU	A brief tornado was caught on video. No damage was found.						
EF2	N of Wetonka	McPherson	SD	45.6688°N 98.7980°W	00:35–00:39	2.66 mi (4.28 km)	150 yd (140 m)
EF2	A large machine shop lost its roof and one of its walls. A large, empty, anchored grain bin was removed from its base, and a nearby feed mill received significant damage. A 400 ft (120 m) by 80 ft (24 m) turkey barn was completely destroyed, along with a smaller outbuilding. A trailer was flipped, a freight storage unit was rotated, and two other outbuildings lost their roof panels. Some residential buildings received roof and siding damage. Tree and crop damage occurred.						

=== July 6 event ===
List of confirmed tornadoes – Monday, July 6, 2020
EF#	Location	County / Parish	State	Start Coord.	Time (UTC)	Path length	Max width
EF0	Caswell Beach	Brunswick	NC	33.8989°N 78.0639°W	18:57–18:58	0.1 mi (0.16 km)	25 yd (23 m)
EF0	This tornado originated as a waterspout just off the coast. The waterspout moved onshore, lofting an umbrella. This tornado may have produced by the precursor disturbance to Tropical Storm Fay, although it is uncertain as to what relationship it truly had with the system.						
EFU	ESE of Rockypoint	Crook	WY	44.872°N 104.908°W	23:26–23:34	3.66 mi (5.89 km)	50 yd (46 m)
EFU	This tornado was caught on video and photos by multiple storm chasers. No damage was found.						
EF2	ENE of Moskee, WY to W of Cheyenne Crossing, SD	Crook (WY), Lawrence (SD)	WY, SD	44.294°N 104.096°W	00:38–00:58	7.4 mi (11.9 km)	770 yd (700 m)
EF2	This large, strong tornado moved through the Black Hills, snapping and uprooting numerous large pine trees.						

=== July 7 event ===
List of confirmed tornadoes – Tuesday, July 7, 2020
EF#	Location	County / Parish	State	Start Coord.	Time (UTC)	Path length	Max width
EF0	ESE of Alford	Pike	IN	38.47°N 87.22°W	20:51–20:52	0.48 mi (0.77 km)	30 yd (27 m)
EF0	A brief landspout tornado was caught on video and photos posted to social media.						
EF0	SW of Winnett	Petroleum	MT	46.9771°N 108.378°W	21:58–22:12	0.14 mi (0.23 km)	20 yd (18 m)
EF0	County dispatch reported a brief tornado.						
EF0	NW of Winnett	Petroleum	MT	47.1774°N 108.5215°W	22:10–22:15	0.15 mi (0.24 km)	50 yd (46 m)
EF0	County dispatch reported a brief, rainwrapped tornado.						
EF1	N of Sanger	Oliver	ND	47.2208°N 100.9934°W	04:30–04:31	0.22 mi (0.35 km)	50 yd (46 m)
EF1	Large cottonwood trees were twisted and snapped in multiple directions.						

=== July 8 event ===
List of confirmed tornadoes – Wednesday, July 8, 2020
EF#	Location	County / Parish	State	Start Coord.	Time (UTC)	Path length	Max width
EF1	NNW of Foxhome to NW of Fergus Falls	Wilkin, Otter Tail	MN	46.30°N 96.33°W	09:20–09:35	12.45 mi (20.04 km)	200 yd (180 m)
EF1	Numerous cottonwood trees were snapped or uprooted, several power poles were snapped, and a welding/manufacturing shop near the Fergus Falls Municipal Airport lost its roof, and had some walls collapse. As the tornado lifted, it may have mangled a wind turbine blade.						
EF1	Friberg Township to NNW of Ottertail	Otter Tail	MN	46.41°N 95.96°W	09:38–10:02	18.69 mi (30.08 km)	250 yd (230 m)
EF1	Numerous pine and oak trees were snapped or uprooted, and power poles were snapped. Several travel trailers were tumbled, roofing was torn off a pole shed, and an irrigation system was tumbled.						
EF2	S of Henning	Otter Tail	MN	46.29°N 95.49°W	10:10–10:15	2 mi (3.2 km)	300 yd (270 m)
EF2	Calving sheds were tossed, and an irrigation system was flipped. Trees and multiple power poles were snapped throughout the path.						
EFU	NE of Sterling	Whiteside	IL	41.8236°N 89.6574°W	21:04–21:05	0.31 mi (0.50 km)	10 yd (9.1 m)
EFU	A brief landspout tornado was caught on video behind a Menards store.						
EF4	W of Ashby to E of Dalton	Grant, Otter Tail	MN	46.09°N 95.94°W	22:08–22:39	8.86 mi (14.26 km)	650 yd (590 m)
EF4	1 death – See article on this tornado – Two people were injured.						
EF0	SSE of Vining	Otter Tail	MN	46.24°N 95.52°W	23:32–23:33	0.2 mi (0.32 km)	20 yd (18 m)
EF0	A persistent funnel cloud touched down briefly as a tornado, producing no damage.						
EF0	ESE of Julesburg (1st tornado)	Sedgwick	CO	40.89°N 102.07°W	23:49–23:50	0.01 mi (0.016 km)	50 yd (46 m)
EF0	A brief tornado touched down, producing no damage.						
EFU	W of Grant	Perkins	NE	40.85°N 101.8157°W	23:50–23:52	0.1 mi (0.16 km)	10 yd (9.1 m)
EFU	A landspout tornado was reported by numerous sources; no damage was found.						
EFU	N of Venango	Perkins	NE	40.8279°N 102.03°W	23:55	0.1 mi (0.16 km)	10 yd (9.1 m)
EFU	Trained storm spotters reported a very brief landspout tornado with no damage.						
EFU	WNW of Grant	Perkins	NE	40.85°N 101.7583°W	00:01	0.1 mi (0.16 km)	10 yd (9.1 m)
EFU	A landspout tornado was reported by numerous sources; no damage was found.						
EF0	N of Amherst	Phillips	CO	40.8513°N 102.132°W	00:04–00:05	0.01 mi (0.016 km)	50 yd (46 m)
EF0	A brief tornado touched down near the intersection of County Road 16 and County Road 55, producing no damage.						
EF0	ESE of Julesburg (2nd tornado)	Sedgwick	CO	40.8655°N 102.2277°W	00:04–00:05	0.01 mi (0.016 km)	50 yd (46 m)
EF0	A brief tornado touched down near the intersection of County Road 18 and US 385, producing no damage.						
EF0	SSE of Julesburg	Sedgwick	CO	40.83°N 102.14°W	00:10–00:11	0.01 mi (0.016 km)	50 yd (46 m)
EF0	A brief tornado touched down, producing no damage.						
EF0	NW of Pine Center to NW of Garrison	Crow Wing	MN	46.2639°N 93.9951°W	00:15–00:38	7.39 mi (11.89 km)	50 yd (46 m)
EF0	A high-end EF0 tornado caused minor damage to one property and downed some trees.						
EF0	SE of Julesburg	Sedgwick	CO	40.8515°N 102.132°W	00:19–00:20	0.01 mi (0.016 km)	50 yd (46 m)
EF0	Another brief tornado touched down near the intersection of County Road 16 and County Road 55, producing damage to an unoccupied building.						
EFU	N of Thedford	Thomas	NE	42.0524°N 100.58°W	00:55–01:10	0.1 mi (0.16 km)	10 yd (9.1 m)
EFU	Multiple sources reported a landspout; no damage was found.						
EF0	NW of Silver Creek	Merrick	NE	41.33°N 97.7°W	04:29–04:36	4.21 mi (6.78 km)	130 yd (120 m)
EF0	Some tree and structural damage occurred. Center pivot sprinklers along or close to the path of this tornado were overturned as well.						

=== July 10 event ===
List of confirmed tornadoes – Friday, July 10, 2020
EF#	Location	County / Parish	State	Start Coord.	Time (UTC)	Path length	Max width
EF1	NW of Cheyenne Crossing to SE of Lead	Lawrence	SD	44.379°N 104.03°W	21:35–21:59	14.81 mi (23.83 km)	250 yd (230 m)
EF1	A tornado snapped or uprooted numerous trees as it moved through the Black Hills. Some trees fell onto homes and power lines.						
EF1	SW of Swett	Bennett	SD	43.223°N 102.06°W	00:42–01:02	11.54 mi (18.57 km)	500 yd (460 m)
EF1	This high-end EF1 tornado destroyed a mobile home, damaged an outbuilding, and inflicted minor shingle damage to a few other homes. Several large steel grain bins were dented. Numerous pine and cottonwood trees were downed along the path, including one that landed on a house.						

=== July 11 event ===
List of confirmed tornadoes – Saturday, July 11, 2020
EF#	Location	County / Parish	State	Start Coord.	Time (UTC)	Path length	Max width
EF1	E of Rolag to WSW of Cormorant	Becker, Otter Tail	MN	46.74°N 96.17°W	18:06–18:12	1.5 mi (2.4 km)	30 yd (27 m)
EF1	At an abandoned farmstead, a barn lost most of its roof and roof panels were taken off other farm buildings.						
EF0	ENE of Hiram to Peabody Pond	Oxford, Cumberland	ME	43.8952°N 70.7593°W	19:31–19:43	4.86 mi (7.82 km)	100 yd (91 m)
EF0	This high-end EF0 tornado, which was generated by the remnants of Tropical Storm Fay, was caught on video as it formed over an island on the west side of Barker Pond. Multiple softwood trees were snapped or uprooted on the east side of the pond. More trees were downed as the tornado moved northeast, including a willow and oak tree. More softwood trees were snapped along the path, and a building lost its tin roof. The tornado lifted as it was over Peabody Pond.						
EF0	ENE of Judson to W of North Mankato	Nicollet	MN	44.2047°N 94.1376°W	20:09–20:13	2.43 mi (3.91 km)	125 yd (114 m)
EF0	Hundreds of trees were snapped or uprooted, and swaths of corn were flattened. A machine shed lost a portion of its roof as well.						
EF0	Southwestern Amarillo	Randall	TX	35.1591°N 101.893°W	00:59–01:00	0.14 mi (0.23 km)	45 yd (41 m)
EF0	A weak, brief landspout tornado broke large tree limbs and damaged fencing in a subdivision. A small metal shed was also destroyed.						

=== July 12 event ===
List of confirmed tornadoes – Sunday, July 12, 2020
EF#	Location	County / Parish	State	Start Coord.	Time (UTC)	Path length	Max width
EF0	NE of Hall Park	Cleveland	OK	35.266°N 97.369°W	05:04	0.2 mi (0.32 km)	10 yd (9.1 m)
EF0	Several trees and the roof of a home were damaged by a brief tornado embedded in damaging winds.						
EFU	WNW of Cheyenne Wells	Cheyenne	CO	38.8475°N 102.437°W	23:50–00:00	1.52 mi (2.45 km)	75 yd (69 m)
EFU	A landspout tornado was reported.						

=== July 14 event ===
List of confirmed tornadoes – Tuesday, July 14, 2020
EF#	Location	County / Parish	State	Start Coord.	Time (UTC)	Path length	Max width
EF0	WNW of Bay St. Louis	Hancock	MS	30.3477°N 89.4075°W	20:24	1 mi (1.6 km)	25 yd (23 m)
EF0	Five homes were damaged after a waterspout moved onshore.						
EF0	N of Palm Beach International Airport	Palm Beach	FL	26.71°N 80.15°W	22:45–22:48	0.25 mi (0.40 km)	25 yd (23 m)
EF0	A landspout tornado was reported. No damage was found.						
EFU	S of Las Animas	Bent	CO	38.03°N 103.26°W	01:00–01:15	2.33 mi (3.75 km)	50 yd (46 m)
EFU	Multiple storm spotters and members of the public reported a tornado. No damage was found.						
EFU	WNW of Gruver	Hansford	TX	36.298°N 101.5286°W	01:02–01:06	1.34 mi (2.16 km)	50 yd (46 m)
EFU	A storm chaser and a local rancher caught a landspout tornado on photos.						

=== July 15 event ===
List of confirmed tornadoes – Wednesday, July 15, 2020
EF#	Location	County / Parish	State	Start Coord.	Time (UTC)	Path length	Max width
EFU	NW of Green Valley	Tazewell	IL	40.4312°N 89.6766°W	18:37–18:38	0.12 mi (0.19 km)	10 yd (9.1 m)
EFU	This very brief tornado touched down in an open field and tracked northward, causing no damage.						
EFU	N of South Pekin to S of Midway	Tazewell	IL	40.5094°N 89.65°W	18:45–18:46	0.13 mi (0.21 km)	10 yd (9.1 m)
EFU	This very brief tornado touched down in an open field and tracked northward, causing no damage.						
EFU	SE of Gridley	McLean	IL	40.7306°N 88.8566°W	21:04–21:05	0.21 mi (0.34 km)	10 yd (9.1 m)
EFU	This very brief tornado touched down in an open field and tracked northward, causing no damage.						
EF0	NNW of Waverly to SW of New Berlin	Morgan, Sangamon	IL	39.6426°N 89.9681°W	21:28–21:37	4.14 mi (6.66 km)	50 yd (46 m)
EF0	This weak tornado caused minor damage to crops and trees.						
EFU	SE of Palmyra	Macoupin	IL	39.4062°N 89.9277°W	21:47–21:48	0.15 mi (0.24 km)	15 yd (14 m)
EFU	This brief tornado was confirmed by a photo from storm spotters. No damage was found.						
EF0	SW of Walshville	Montgomery	IL	39.0338°N 89.6904°W	21:58–22:02	3.21 mi (5.17 km)	75 yd (69 m)
EF0	Some trees were snapped or uprooted on an intermittent path.						
EF0	NE of Walshville	Montgomery	IL	39.0907°N 89.5977°W	22:05–22:06	0.57 mi (0.92 km)	50 yd (46 m)
EF0	One home had minor structural damage. Trees were snapped or uprooted.						
EF0	N of Farmersville to S of Divernon	Montgomery, Sangamon	IL	39.4725°N 89.6871°W	22:18–22:26	4.53 mi (7.29 km)	300 yd (270 m)
EF0	This tornado was caught on video by storm chasers. In the video, "the tornado appeared to be multivortex and violent." Damage observed by the National Weather Service in Saint Louis, Missouri, included some snapped tree branches, flattened swaths of corn, and the partial destruction of a small outbuilding. This tornado crossed into the National Weather Service Lincoln, Illinois, area of responsibility, and lifted after 0.25 mi (0.40 km).						
EF0	E of Veguita	Socorro	NM	34.5113°N 106.7164°W	00:03–00:18	0.35 mi (0.56 km)	30 yd (27 m)
EF0	A brief landspout tornado did not cause damage.						
EF1	S of Parkers Settlement	Posey, Vanderburgh	IN	38.0116°N 87.7395°W	04:40–04:48	4.33 mi (6.97 km)	80 yd (73 m)
EF1	Damage occurred to trees and power lines. A couple of homes lost some shingles and fascia. One vehicle was damaged by a fallen tree.						

=== July 16 event ===
List of confirmed tornadoes – Thursday, July 16, 2020
EF#	Location	County / Parish	State	Start Coord.	Time (UTC)	Path length	Max width
EF0	SSW of Brant	Erie	NY	42.57°N 79.05°W	20:15–20:16	1.75 mi (2.82 km)	50 yd (46 m)
EF0	Video of this tornado was sent to the National Weather Service. A damage survey done via a drone found several trees that were downed by the tornado.						
EF1	S of Portland	Chautauqua	NY	42.3259°N 79.4684°W	20:50–20:52	1.5 mi (2.4 km)	35 yd (32 m)
EF1	A 60 ft (18 m) by 80 ft (24 m) garage was flattened, a 53 ft (16 m) semi trailer was lifted, rotated and set down 150 ft (46 m) away. The majority of an 80 ft (24 m) by 50 ft (15 m) barn was destroyed, with only the front facade remaining. The second story of a separate barn was torn away. Two more barns were damaged before the tornado lifted.						
EF0	WSW of Cortez	Manatee	FL	27.45°N 82.69°W	22:05–22:10	0.16 mi (0.26 km)	75 yd (69 m)
EF0	Multiple trees were downed after a waterspout came onshore near Coquina Beach.						

=== July 17 event ===
List of confirmed tornadoes – Friday, July 17, 2020
EF#	Location	County / Parish	State	Start Coord.	Time (UTC)	Path length	Max width
EF0	E of Niles	Benson	ND	48.29°N 99.25°W	19:59–20:00	0.1 mi (0.16 km)	30 yd (27 m)
EF0	A brief, rain-wrapped tornado embedded within a much larger area of damaging winds touched down in an open field. No damage information was given.						
EF1	E of Niles	Benson	ND	48.27°N 99.26°W	20:47–20:48	0.25 mi (0.40 km)	40 yd (37 m)
EF1	A brief, rain-wrapped tornado embedded within a much larger area of downburst winds snapped numerous trees near US 2. A nearby RWIS mesonet weather station reported a wind gust up to 101 mph (163 km/h).						
EF1	Argyle	Marshall	MN	48.35°N 96.86°W	21:54–21:59	3.16 mi (5.09 km)	150 yd (140 m)
EF1	This tornado moved through Argyle, crumpling multiple grain bins, snapping trees, and tearing shingles off of roofs. It also caved in a tall grain bin and tore its top conveyor off at an elevator complex. Bleachers were tossed at a baseball field as well.						

=== July 18 event ===
List of confirmed tornadoes – Saturday, July 18, 2020
EF#	Location	County / Parish	State	Start Coord.	Time (UTC)	Path length	Max width
EF1	E of Day to SSW of Coin	Isanti	MN	45.7097°N 93.3828°W	05:59–06:05	2.96 mi (4.76 km)	150 yd (140 m)
EF1	This tornado snapped or uprooted trees along its path. A partially filled grain bin was blown off its foundation. A local anemometer measured an 87 mph (140 km/h) gust.						
EF0	NNE of Rush Point	Chisago	MN	45.6716°N 93.1011°W	06:17–06:19	1.26 mi (2.03 km)	75 yd (69 m)
EF0	Boats and docks were damaged and trees were downed at Rush Lake.						
EF1	N of Blueberry	Douglas	WI	46.6036°N 91.6702°W	06:48–06:50	0.42 mi (0.68 km)	50 yd (46 m)
EF1	Trees were downed, a few of which landed on a structure.						
EF1	N of Sanborn	Ashland	WI	46.4429°N 90.9128°W	07:51–07:53	0.6 mi (0.97 km)	50 yd (46 m)
EF1	A garage lost most of its roof panels, and a metal outbuilding collapsed.						
EF0	Southeastern Woodbury	Washington	MN	44.8809°N 92.9104°W	02:42–02:51	2.85 mi (4.59 km)	180 yd (160 m)
EF0	Several trees and some greenhouses were damaged at the southeastern outskirts of Woodbury. A house sustained minor soffit damage as well.						
EF1	N of Hastings, MN to SE of River Falls, WI	Washington (MN), Pierce (WI)	MN, WI	44.8167°N 92.8458°W	02:54–03:20	9.46 mi (15.22 km)	400 yd (370 m)
EF1	Multiple farm outbuildings were damaged, and a house sustained damage to its attached garage. Power lines were downed, and a metal grain silo was dented. Trees were snapped, including some of which that were snapped halfway up the trunk.						

=== July 19 event ===
List of confirmed tornadoes – Sunday, July 19, 2020
EF#	Location	County / Parish	State	Start Coord.	Time (UTC)	Path length	Max width
EF1	SW of Osseo	Trempealeau	WI	44.5500°N 91.2933°W	05:50–05:57	3.62 mi (5.83 km)	200 yd (180 m)
EF1	Several farm outbuildings were damaged, and trees were snapped or uprooted.						
EF0	NNE of Paoli	Phillips	CO	40.69°N 102.43°W	00:29–00:30	0.01 mi (0.016 km)	50 yd (46 m)
EF0	A brief tornado touched down in an open field, producing no damage.						

=== July 20 event ===
List of confirmed tornadoes – Monday, July 20, 2020
EF#	Location	County / Parish	State	Start Coord.	Time (UTC)	Path length	Max width
EF0	NE of Metropolis	Massac	IL	37.1898°N 88.6992°W	20:01–20:02	0.26 mi (0.42 km)	30 yd (27 m)
EF0	Tree limbs were snapped and a tree was uprooted. A wooden fence surrounding a port-a-potty, and another port-a-potty were both blown over. All of this occurred at a country club.						
EFU	SW of Roseglen	McLean	ND	47.71°N 101.9°W	20:10–20:12	0.23 mi (0.37 km)	25 yd (23 m)
EFU	A brief tornado touched down in an open field, producing no damage.						

=== July 21 event ===
List of confirmed tornadoes – Tuesday, July 21, 2020
EF#	Location	County / Parish	State	Start Coord.	Time (UTC)	Path length	Max width
EF1	NW of Compro to NNE of Auburn	Sanagamon	IL	39.5972°N 89.813°W	21:05–21:09	4.36 mi (7.02 km)	100 yd (91 m)
EF1	2 large sheds and 2 grain bins were destroyed. An RV was blown over, trees were damaged, and minor roof damage occurred at 2 homes and 2 large pole barns. 100 acres of corn and soybeans were also damaged before the tornado lifted near IL-4.						
EFU	White Oak	Montgomery	IL	39.5135°N 89.5666°W	21:18–21:19	0.2 mi (0.32 km)	10 yd (9.1 m)
EFU	A report of a tornado was relayed by emergency management. No damage was observed.						
EF0	WNW of Clayton	Polk	WI	45.3425°N 92.224°W	22:32–22:33	0.19 mi (0.31 km)	25 yd (23 m)
EF0	Some large tree branches were snapped. This brief tornado was caught on video by a storm chaser.						
EF0	W of Arland	Barron	WI	45.3397°N 92.092°W	22:50–22:56	1.54 mi (2.48 km)	20 yd (18 m)
EF0	As the tornado passed through wooded areas, large tree branches were snapped. This tornado was caught on video by a storm chaser, and was reported by the local fire department.						
EF0	NE of Wheeler	Dunn	WI	45.1047°N 91.8261°W	23:40–23:41	0.09 mi (0.14 km)	25 yd (23 m)
EF0	This tornado was caught on video by a storm chaser. Some trees were damaged.						
EF0	NE of Elk Mound to WSW of Chippewa Falls	Chippewa	WI	44.9041°N 91.5972°W	01:12–01:29	3.45 mi (5.55 km)	25 yd (23 m)
EF0	Multiple storm chasers and storm spotters observed this tornado. The tornado stayed over mainly open fields, but damaged trees as it hit wooded areas.						
EF0	Cadott	Chippewa	WI	44.9425°N 91.1853°W	01:44–01:53	2.9 mi (4.7 km)	150 yd (140 m)
EF0	Some homes and vehicles were damaged by fallen trees. A church lost part of its roof. Other homes in Cadott also had minor roof damage. A shed slid off of its foundation.						

=== July 22 event ===
List of confirmed tornadoes – Wednesday, July 22, 2020
EF#	Location	County / Parish	State	Start Coord.	Time (UTC)	Path length	Max width
EFU	SSE of Crosbyton	Crosby	TX	33.55°N 101.2°W	19:42	0.01 mi (0.016 km)	10 yd (9.1 m)
EFU	A picture confirming a brief landspout tornado was relayed by local broadcast media.						

=== July 23 event ===
List of confirmed tornadoes – Thursday, July 23, 2020
EF#	Location	County / Parish	State	Start Coord.	Time (UTC)	Path length	Max width
EF0	W of Castle Rock	Butte	SD	44.97°N 103.5732°W	20:57	0.05 mi (0.080 km)	10 yd (9.1 m)
EF0	A storm chaser reported a brief tornado near US-85 over open land.						

=== July 24 event ===
List of confirmed tornadoes – Friday, July 24, 2020
EF#	Location	County / Parish	State	Start Coord.	Time (UTC)	Path length	Max width
EF0	SE of Kingman Airport	Mohave	AZ	35.2220°N 113.8609°W	17:55–18:03	0.98 mi (1.58 km)	50 yd (46 m)
EF0	Multiple photos and videos from the public and other sources confirmed this rope tornado. No damage was found.						
EF0	E of Fountain Hills	Maricopa	AZ	33.63°N 111.56°W	23:00–23:05	0.36 mi (0.58 km)	50 yd (46 m)
EF0	A brief landspout tornado was caught on video. No damage occurred.						

=== July 25 event ===
Event in Texas is associated with Hurricane Hanna.

List of confirmed tornadoes – Saturday, July 25, 2020
EF#	Location	County / Parish	State	Start Coord.	Time (UTC)	Path length	Max width
EF0	NNW of Rollag	Clay	MN	46.77°N 96.25°W	07:26–07:27	0.4 mi (0.64 km)	40 yd (37 m)
EF0	Sunflowers were knocked down, as the tornado left behind a distinctive swirl pattern.						
EFU	WSW of Bonnie View	Refugio	TX	28.16°N 97.35°W	17:48	0.1 mi (0.16 km)	25 yd (23 m)
EFU	A brief tornado touched down in an open field, producing no damage.						
EF1	NNW of Gaylord	Sibley	MN	44.5851°N 94.2473°W	23:31–23:38	1.89 mi (3.04 km)	50 yd (46 m)
EF1	A local resident and a storm chaser caught this tornado on video. Large tree branches were snapped.						
EF0	N of Gaylord	Sibley	MN	44.6018°N 94.2095°W	23:37–23:38	0.18 mi (0.29 km)	15 yd (14 m)
EF0	This tornado was caught on video by a storm chaser. Some tree branches were snapped.						
EF0	Lagarto	Live Oak	TX	28.11°N 97.914°W	03:11–03:16	2.52 mi (4.06 km)	100 yd (91 m)
EF0	One home had minor siding damage. Tree branches were snapped.						
EF0	Pernitas Point	Jim Wells, Live Oak	TX	28.057°N 97.895°W	03:30–03:33	0.6 mi (0.97 km)	100 yd (91 m)
EF0	Two stop signs were damaged, and a tree was uprooted.						

=== July 26 event ===
Event in Texas is associated with Hurricane Hanna.

List of confirmed tornadoes – Sunday, July 26, 2020
EF#	Location	County / Parish	State	Start Coord.	Time (UTC)	Path length	Max width
EF0	Brownsville/South Padre Island International Airport	Cameron	TX	25.8729°N 97.4287°W	08:32–08:36	3.43 mi (5.52 km)	50 yd (46 m)
EF0	This tornado first touched down about 2.3 miles (3.7 km) south of the airport, where it pushed an empty tractor-trailer into a stand of trees, flipped an unanchored travel trailer, flattened a storage shed, and damaged several mesquite trees. Once the tornado reached the west side of the airport, it blew out a dozen windows at an airplane hangar. An unanchored, old jet staircase was flipped, and a garage door collapsed inward. A Boeing 737 airplane was pushed into a hangar, damaging its wall. Two homes lost significant sections of their roofing as well. Large tree branches were snapped, and a weak tree was also uprooted before the tornado dissipated.						
EF0	NNW of Sutherland Springs to S of La Vernia	Wilson	TX	29.2917°N 98.0723°W	10:10–10:17	3.27 mi (5.26 km)	20 yd (18 m)
EF0	Outbuildings, power poles and lines, and trees were damaged.						
EFU	S of Whiteside	Limestone	AL	34.6222°N 86.9535°W	23:53–00:05	0.23 mi (0.37 km)	25 yd (23 m)
EFU	A well-observed elephant trunk waterspout was observed over Lake Wheeler, becoming a landspout tornado at times as it scraped the eastern shoreline. No damage was reported.						

=== July 29 event ===
List of confirmed tornadoes – Wednesday, July 29, 2020
EF#	Location	County / Parish	State	Start Coord.	Time (UTC)	Path length	Max width
EF0	E of Smithville	Clay	MO	39.37°N 94.5819°W	18:45–18:46	0.27 mi (0.43 km)	20 yd (18 m)
EF0	A very brief and weak tornado caused no damage.						
EF0	Wheatland Center to S of Scottsville	Monroe	NY	43.00°N 77.82°W	22:53–22:57	4.2 mi (6.8 km)	100 yd (91 m)
EF0	Trees were snapped or uprooted, including one 5 ft (1.5 m) diameter hardwood tree which was twisted and snapped. A swath of corn in a farm field was flattened.						

== See also ==
- Tornadoes of 2020
- List of United States tornadoes in April 2020
- List of United States tornadoes from August to September 2020
