= KGXY =

KGXY may refer to:

- Greeley–Weld County Airport (ICAO code KGXY)
- KGXY-LP, a low-power radio station (99.3 FM) licensed to serve Muir Beach, California, United States
