= Winnett Block =

Historic place in Montana, United States

- U.S. National Register of Historic Places
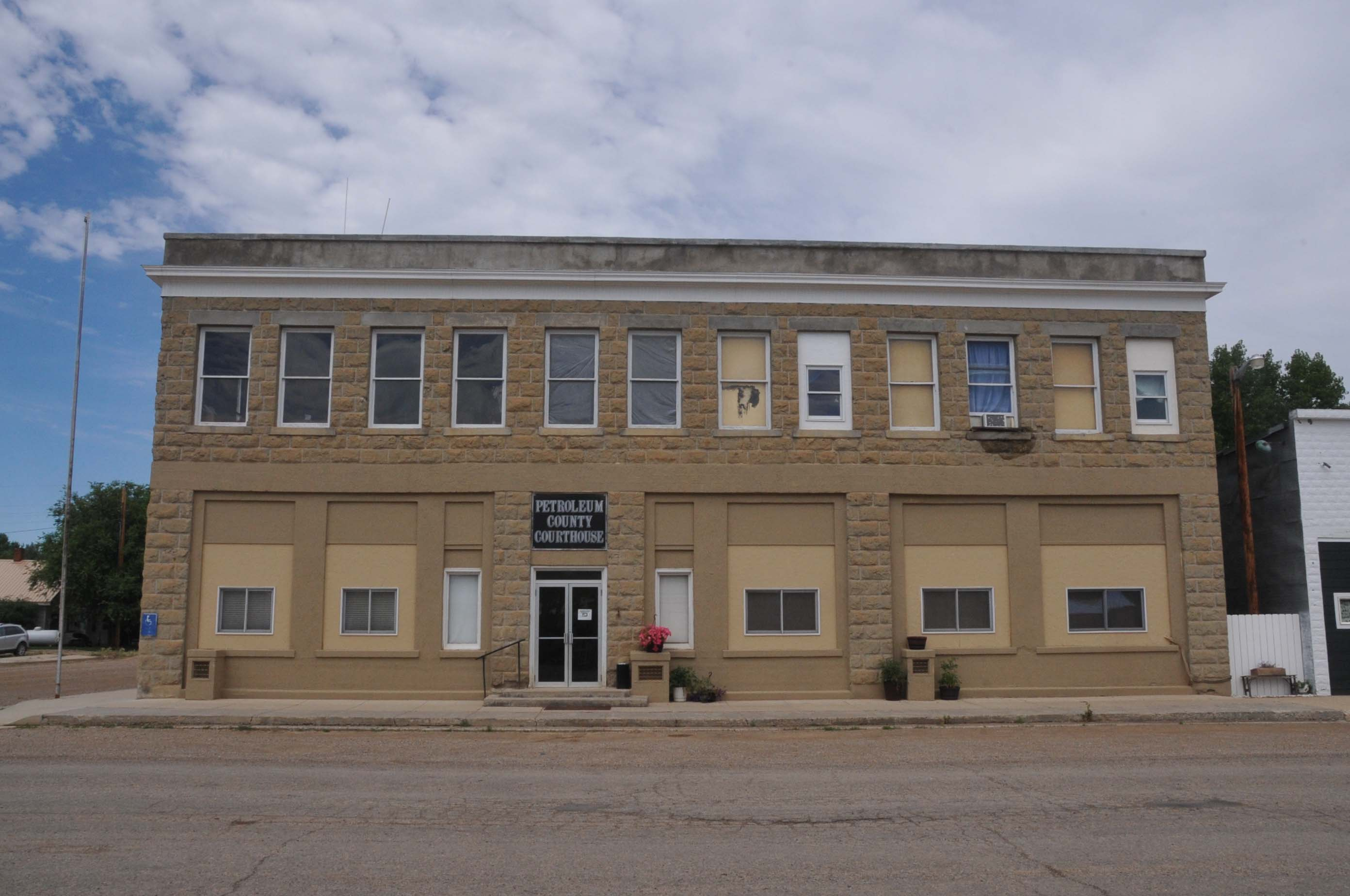

- Location within Montana Location within the United States
- Interactive map showing the location of Winnett Block
- Location: 301 E. Main St., Winnett, Montana
- Coordinates: 47°0′16″N 108°20′53″W
- Area: less than one acre
- Built: 1917
- Architectural style: Early Commercial
- NRHP reference No.: 09000815
- Added to NRHP: October 8, 2009

The Winnett Block is a site on the National Register of Historic Places located in Winnett, Montana. It was added to the Register on October 8, 2009. Built in 1918 from locally quarried sandstone, it was originally for commercial use. It became the Petroleum County Courthouse in 1928.
