= Winnett School =

- U.S. National Register of Historic Places
- Monument with historic bell (left) next to the new school

- Location within Montana Location within the United States
- Location: Junction of Moulton Ave. and Rowley St., Winnett, Montana
- Coordinates: 47°00′07″N 108°21′12″W
- Built: 1919, 1921
- Built by: Sullivan Construction
- Architect: Otto Wasmansdorff
- Architectural style: Bungalow / Craftsman
- NRHP reference No.: 95000383
- Added to NRHP: April 6, 1995

The Winnett School is a site in Winnett, Montana which was added to the National Register of Historic Places on April 6, 1995.

In 1912, Frank Moshner built a one-room wood-frame building which came to be known as the "Little White Schoolhouse" on Broadway. A much larger school was built in phases next to it, primarily in 1919 and 1921 by Sullivan Construction of Roundup, Montana, designed in a Spanish stucco style by Otto F. Wasmansdorff of Lewistown.

The Little White Schoolhouse was moved in 1965 and became a Methodist Church. In 1994, the rest of the campus, which had been expanded and remodeled several times, was demolished and replaced, with the old school bell used in a historic monument.
