= Peabody Pond =

- Location within Maine Location within the United States
- Location: Maine
- Coordinates: 43°57′N 70°41′W
- Lake type: Reservoir
- Primary outflows: Northwest River
- Basin countries: United States
- Max. length: 2 mi (3.2 km)
- Max. width: 1 mi (1.6 km)
- Surface area: 740 acres (300 ha)
- Max. depth: 64 feet (20 m)
- Water volume: 24,496 acre⋅ft (30,215,000 m^{3})
- Surface elevation: 479 ft (146 m)
- Islands: 2 (Blueberry Island, Seth Island)

Peabody Pond extends from the southern tip of Bridgton into northern Sebago forming the western boundary of Naples, Maine. The eastern tip of the lake receives drainage from Cold Rain Pond in Naples. The southern tip of the lake overflows as the Northwest River through 5 miles (8.0 km) of boggy land to the western shore of Sebago Lake at East Sebago. The pond has a native population of rainbow smelt, and has been stocked with smallmouth bass, lake trout, and land-locked Atlantic salmon. A boat-launching area near the outlet of the lake is accessible from Peabody Pond Road off Tiger Hill Road. Peabody Pond road is a dead end road that terminates at Martin Point.
