= Cheyenne Crossing, South Dakota =

Populated place in South Dakota, United States

Coordinates: 44°17′46″N 103°52′10″W

Cheyenne Crossing (also known as Spearfish Crossing) is a populated place in Lawrence County, South Dakota, United States.

In 1877 the Ice Box Canyon Valley Station was the last of 11 stops on the Cheyenne to Deadwood stage route. Henry Fosha operated a stable and barn in this approximate location where tired stagecoach horses were replaced by fresh horses on the final showy run into Deadwood. Fosha ran a store across the dirt road that carried basic supplies for the coach and other travelers. At some point owners changed the station's name to Cheyenne Crossing. The stage route operated until 1887 and the stables were abandoned. In the 1950s the Highway Department widened the highway and the owners relocated the store to where it still stands [in 2025]. A historical marker about the Cheyenne Crossing was erected in 2024 by Lawrence County Historical Society. The marker is located on Spearfish Canyon Road at or near this postal address: 21415 US Highway 14A, Lead SD 57754.
