= Bethany, South Carolina =

Settlement in South Carolina, United States

Coordinates: 35°07′01″N 81°18′22″W

Bethany is an unincorporated community in York County, in the U.S. state of South Carolina.

== History ==
A post office called Bethany was established in 1851, and remained in operation until 1902. The community took its name from the local Bethany Associate Reformed Presbyterian Church.
