= Tropical Storm Bertha (2020) =

Atlantic tropical storm

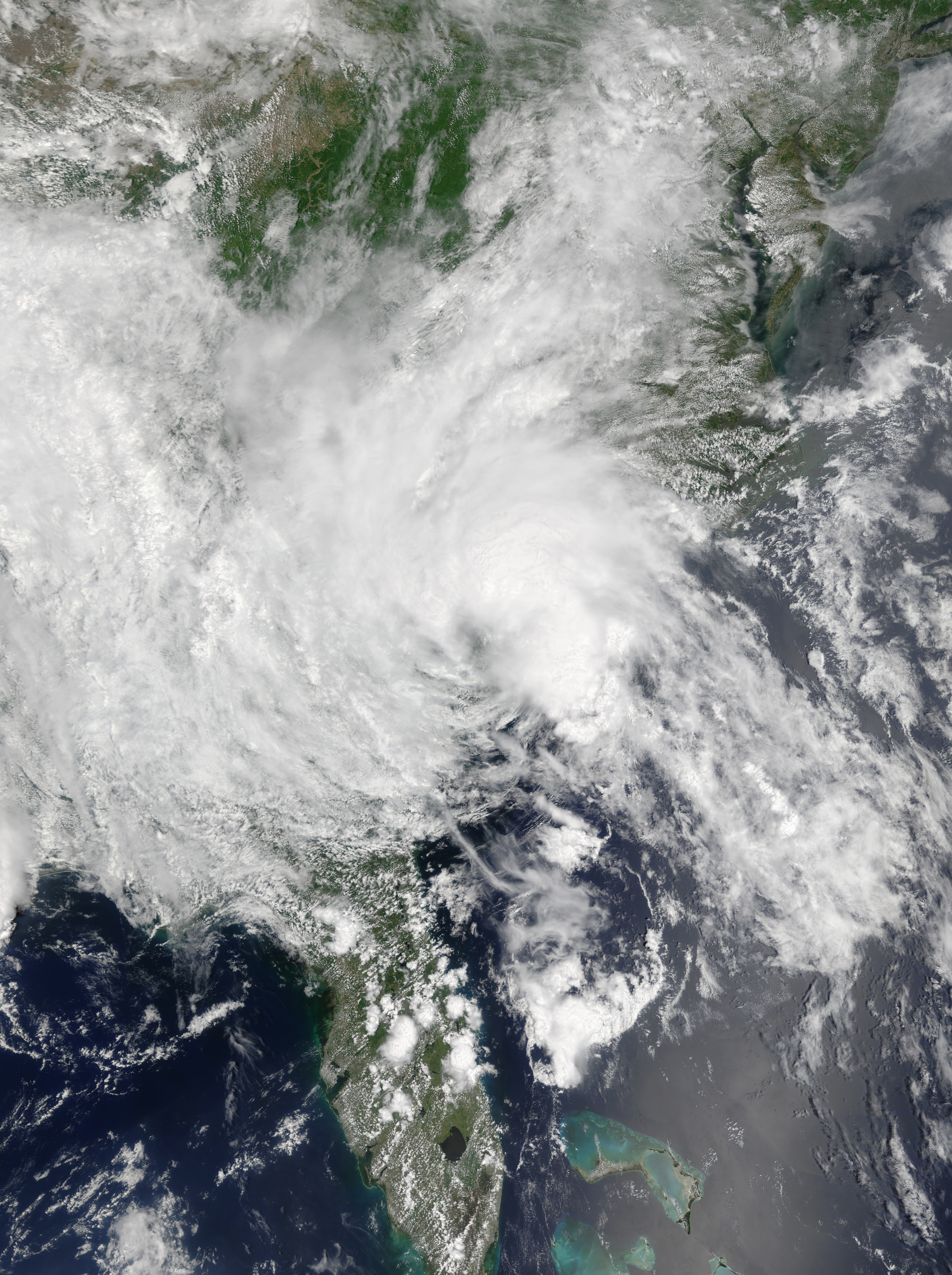
- Bertha making landfall on the east coast of South Carolina while at peak intensity on May 27

Meteorological history
- Formed: May 27, 2020
- Extratropical: May 28, 2020
- Dissipated: May 28, 2020

Tropical storm
- 1-minute sustained (SSHWS/NWS)
- Highest winds: 50 mph (85 km/h)
- Lowest pressure: 1005 mbar (hPa); 29.68 inHg

Overall effects
- Fatalities: 1 total
- Damage: $130,000 (2020 USD)
- Areas affected: Eastern United States (especially Florida and South Carolina)
- Part of the 2020 Atlantic hurricane season

Tropical Storm Bertha was a rapidly forming and short-lived off-season tropical storm that affected the Eastern United States in late May 2020. The second named storm of the very active 2020 Atlantic hurricane season, Bertha originated from a trough in the Gulf of Mexico. The National Hurricane Center (NHC) only anticipated slight development as the trough moved over southern Florida, bringing torrential rainfall. The system rapidly organized on May 27 after it emerged into the western Atlantic Ocean, developing a small, well-defined circulation. That day, the disturbance developed into Tropical Storm Bertha east of Georgia, and a few hours later it moved ashore near Isle of Palms, South Carolina with peak winds of 50 mph (80 km/h). The storm weakened over land and dissipated late on May 28 over West Virginia.

The storm and its precursor disturbance caused heavy rainfall and flash flooding in southern Florida, as well as spawning a brief tornado. In South Carolina, Bertha produced above normal tides and locally heavy rainfall, causing minor flooding. As the storm moved into North Carolina, its remnants produced a brief tornado, while rip currents resulted in several water rescues in Surf City. According to the National Centers for Environmental Information, Bertha caused $130,000 (2020 USD) in damage.

== Meteorological history ==
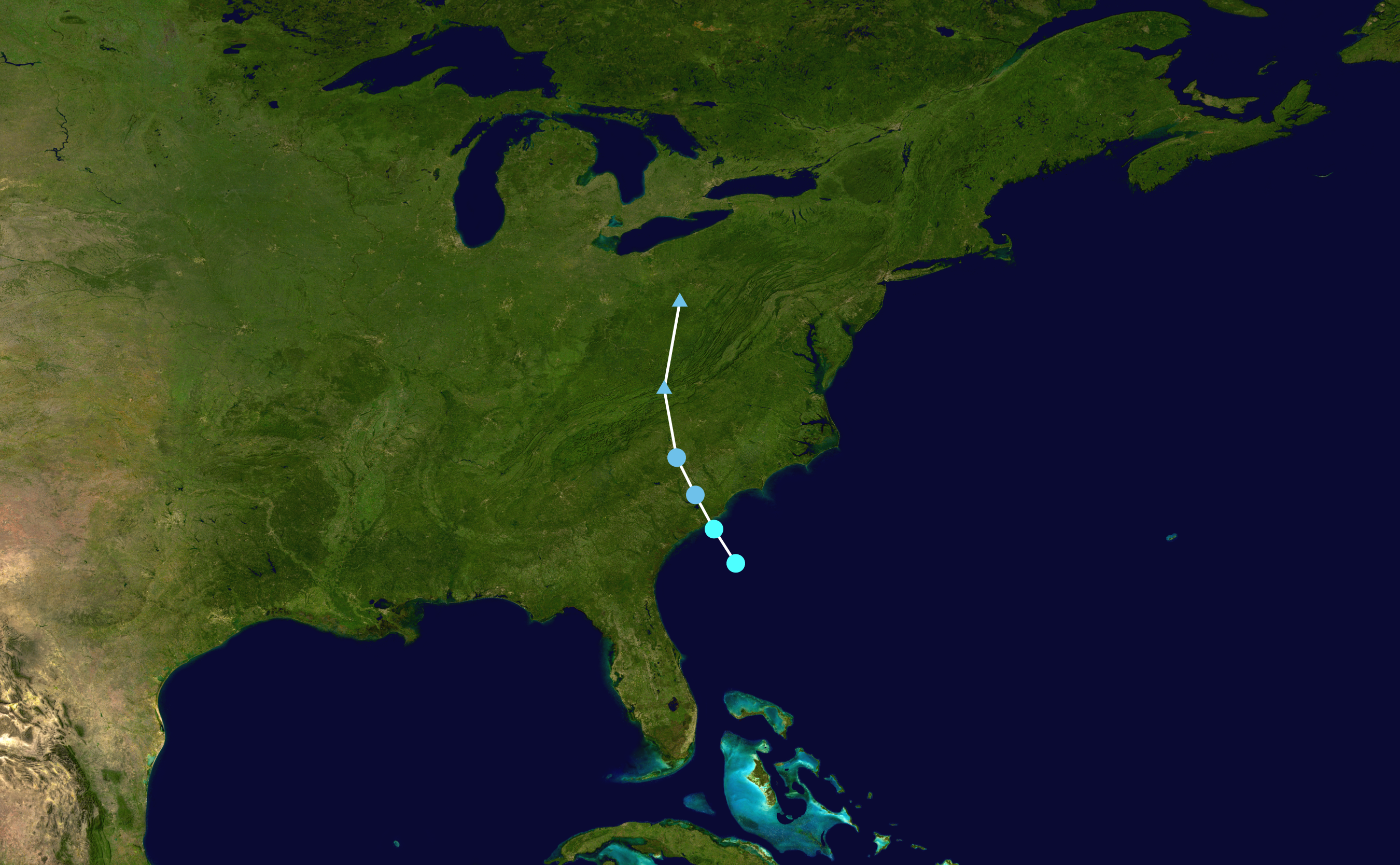
Map plotting the storm's track and intensity, according to the Saffir–Simpson scale Map key Saffir–Simpson scale Tropical depression (≤38 mph, ≤62 km/h) Tropical storm (39–73 mph, 63–118 km/h) Category 1 (74–95 mph, 119–153 km/h) Category 2 (96–110 mph, 154–177 km/h) Category 3 (111–129 mph, 178–208 km/h) Category 4 (130–156 mph, 209–251 km/h) Category 5 (≥157 mph, ≥252 km/h) Unknown Storm type Tropical cyclone Subtropical cyclone Extratropical cyclone, remnant low, tropical disturbance, or monsoon depression

A trough, or elongated low pressure area, developed in the southeastern Gulf of Mexico on May 24. By that time, the trough extended across southern Florida into the western Atlantic Ocean, producing a widespread area of thunderstorms. The National Hurricane Center (NHC) first mentioned the system in a special tropical weather outlook on May 25, assessing a 20% chance for tropical cyclogenesis, due to expected strong wind shear, the proximity to land, and dry air. By that time, the trough extended across southern Florida into the western Atlantic Ocean, producing a widespread area of thunderstorms. A weak surface low formed near Orlando, Florida early on May 26, which moved northeast over water by early the following day. Subsequently, the NHC increased the system's development potential to 30%.

Early on May 27, the system developed a well-defined center underneath an area of organized thunderstorms. In addition, an offshore buoy recorded tropical storm-force winds. The NHC estimated that the system developed into Tropical Storm Bertha at 06:00 UTC that day while located about 140 mi (230 km) east of Savannah, Georgia. Operationally, it was not until 12:30 UTC that the NHC had initiated advisories on Bertha. The storm had characteristics of both a tropical and a subtropical cyclone, but the NHC designated it as tropical due to the storm's small radius of maximum winds. Upon its formation, Bertha was moving northwestward around the western side of a ridge over the western Atlantic. At 12:00 UTC, the storm had reached peak winds of 50 mph (80 km/h); this was based on observations from buoys and the storm's well-defined curved rainbands near the center. Its gale-force winds extended only 25 mi (40 km) from the center. At 13:00 UTC on May 27, 2020, Bertha made landfall near Isle of Palms, South Carolina while at peak intensity. The storm quickly weakened as it progressed inland, falling to tropical depression status within a few hours of moving ashore. The depression turned toward the north, moving through western North Carolina and into western Virginia. Early on May 28, Bertha transitioned into an extratropical cyclone, which persisted another 12 hours before dissipating over northern West Virginia.

== Preparations and impact ==
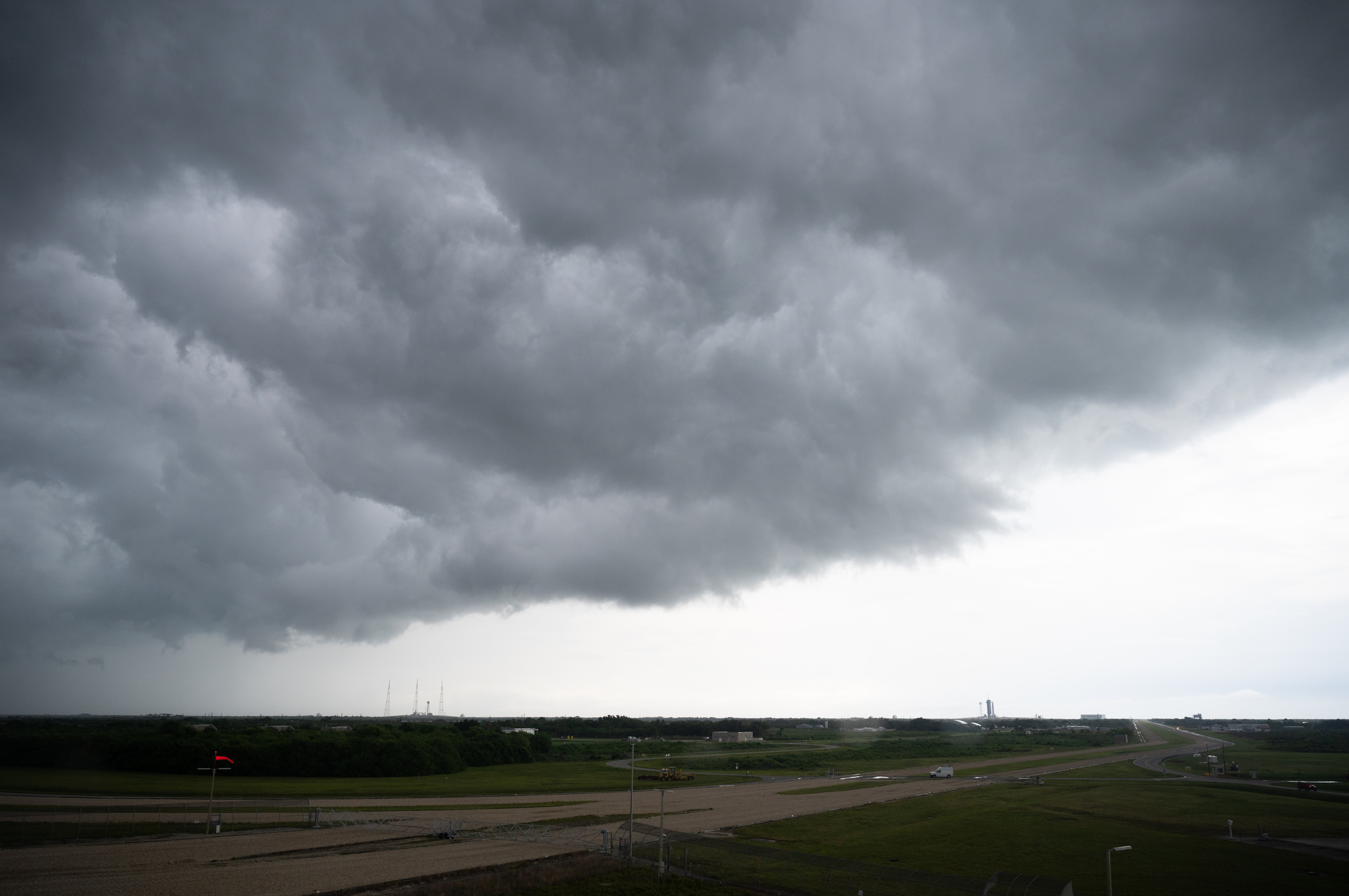
Storm clouds from Bertha at Kennedy Space Center, which disrupted the launch of the Crew Dragon Demo-2

=== Florida ===
The precursor disturbance to Tropical Storm Bertha caused a significant, multi-day rainfall event across South Florida, reaching 8–10 in (200–250 mm) across several locations. The peak 72–hour accumulation was 14.19 in (360 mm), recorded in Miami. Rainfall rates of 4 in (100 mm) an hour contributed to a 24-hour total of 7.4 in (190 mm) there, more than doubling the previous daily rainfall record and resulting in the city's most significant rain event in eight years. The precursor disturbance spawned an EF1 tornado in Aladdin City, which produced winds of 90 mph (140 km/h) and was on the ground for 4.83 mi (7.77 km). The tornado damaged trees and fences, and overturned several campers. Thunderstorms produced hail up to 1 in (25 mm) in diameter near Wellington, as well as wind gusts estimated up to 65 mph (105 km/h).

In and around Miami, the rains flooded homes and roadways, especially in close proximity to canals. Some homes even reported partial roof collapses throughout Hallandale Beach and Hollywood as a result of the heavy precipitation. Local police in El Portal asked that the South Florida Water Management District open floodgates to relieve flooding in those canals. Floodwaters entered vehicles and buildings in Miami Beach and Hialeah, prompting several water rescues. Hialeah's mayor asked residents to remain indoors accordingly. Days of heavy rainfall prompted local National Weather Service offices to issue flash flood warnings, and sporadic severe thunderstorms prompted additional advisories. Strong wind gusts uprooted a tree onto Route A1A. As the low associated with Bertha moved northeastward, it also produced minor flooding near St. Augustine due to heavy rainfall. Unsettled weather related to Bertha forced the cancellation of the planned Crew Dragon Demo-2 launch on May 27 from Cape Canaveral. Damage across the state was estimated at $71,000.

=== Carolinas ===
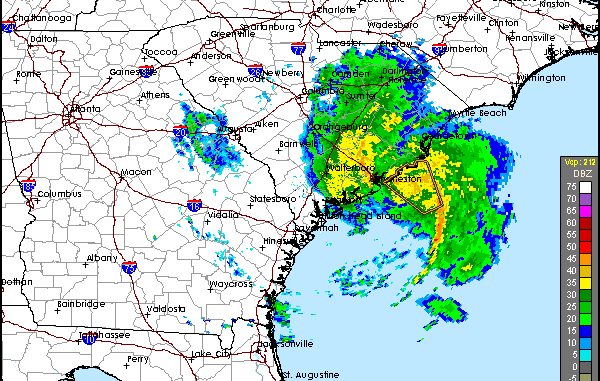
Tropical Storm Bertha at landfall near Charleston, South Carolina

Ahead of Bertha's development, the NHC warned of the potential that the system could cause flash flooding, dangerous marine conditions, life-threatening surf and rip currents. Upon Bertha's development, the NHC issued a tropical storm warning for the South Carolina coastline from Edisto Beach to South Santee River, only an hour before landfall. The National Hurricane Center warned that given very saturated antecedent conditions, rainfall from Bertha could produce life-threatening flash flooding and river flooding. The 2020 Alsco Uniforms 500, held in Charlotte, North Carolina, was also postponed a day due to the possibility of bad weather.

Upon moving ashore, Bertha produced a small storm surge, causing some coastal flooding. Wrightsville Beach, North Carolina recorded water levels 1.32 ft (0.40 m) above normal, the highest tides related to the storm. Bertha also dropped rainfall across South Carolina, reaching 5 in (130 mm) in some locations. Wind gusts on land reached 53 mph (85 km/h) in Winyah Bay.

Floods in Charleston, South Carolina inundated streets and cars. A few streams exceeded their banks in Lancaster County, flooding some bridges. Minor power outages occurred throughout South Carolina. A drowning was reported in Myrtle Beach due to rip currents from Bertha after the storm made landfall. Heavy rainfall in North Carolina flooded roads and streams near Charlotte. The storm's remnants spawned a brief EF0 tornado in northern Warren County, which destroyed a building and uprooted a few trees. Damage caused by tornado was estimated at $50,000, although it was not considered to be directly associated with Bertha. At least ten people required rescue in Surf City from rip currents.

=== Elsewhere ===
The remnants of Bertha later brought rainfall to West Virginia, resulting in flash flooding in Kanawha County that inundated some roads. Statewide damage was estimated at $16,000. Rainfall from Bertha extended into northeastern Ohio, where it was the earliest former tropical cyclone to affect the state on record. Pittsburgh, Pennsylvania recorded 0.61 in (15 mm) of rainfall related to the storm.

== See also ==
- Timeline of the 2020 Atlantic hurricane season
- Tropical cyclones in 2020
- Other storms with the same name
- Tropical Storm Ana (2015) – off-season storm that struck South Carolina
- Tropical Storm Bonnie (2016) – off-season storm that struck South Carolina
- Tropical Storm Arthur (2020) – off-season storm that same month, also dumped heavy rainfall in Florida
- Tropical Storm Danny (2021) – rapidly forming, short lived storm that took a similar track
- Tropical Storm Colin (2022) – another rapidly forming, short lived storm that impacted the Carolinas
- Tropical Storm Ophelia (2023) – yet another rapidly forming storm that made landfall in the Carolinas
- Tropical Storm Chantal (2025) – a system that took a similar track, making landfall in the Carolinas
