= Winnett, Montana =

- Town
- Winnett, Montana in 2026

- Location of Winnett, Montana
- Coordinates: 47°00′06″N 108°20′49″W
- Country: United States
- State: Montana
- County: Petroleum
- Named for: Walter J. Winnett

Area
  - Total: 1.02 sq mi (2.64 km^{2})
  - Land: 1.02 sq mi (2.64 km^{2})
  - Water: 0 sq mi (0.00 km^{2})
- Elevation: 2,943 ft (897 m)

Population (2020)
  - Total: 188
  - Density: 184.6/sq mi (71.28/km^{2})
- Time zone: UTC-7 (Mountain (MST))
  - Summer (DST): UTC-6 (MDT)
- ZIP codes: 59084, 59087
- Area code: 406
- FIPS code: 30-81100
- GNIS feature ID: 2413500

Winnett is a town in and the county seat of Petroleum County, Montana, United States. The population was 188 at the 2020 census.

In addition to county government offices, Winnett's businesses and services include a general store, two filling/service stations, a post office, a school system with grades K-12, an event venue completed in 2023, a motel, 2 RV parks, a campground, and a bar-and-grill.

Local news is reported from the Roundup Record Tribune & Winnett Times. It is published weekly and also available online.

The nearest medical facilities are in Lewistown.

== History ==
Winnett was named for Walter John Winnett (1860–1943), who was born at the Queen's Hotel in Toronto, Ontario, Canada. Winnett ran away from home as a boy, seeking adventure in "Indian country." His excellent marksmanship abilities helped him get jobs with outfits who were always looking for someone who could keep them in fresh meat. When he was captured by Sioux Indians and later adopted into the tribe, he was given the name Eagle Eyes because of his remarkable shooting skills.

Winnett established a ranch in Montana Territory in 1879 near an active trading post and the Hangman's Tree used by vigilantes in the area. The massive ranch house, which he built in 1900 housed his own family and served as a gathering place for the community. Dances, weddings, funerals, church services, and school were all held here. Billings was the closest town, so Winnett built up a freight line business to haul supplies. Each of his outfits consisted of ten to twenty horses and huge wagons. In 1910 he built a store and petitioned for a post office.

In February 1920, oil was discovered in nearby Cat Creek. Winnett's population nearly doubled in less than a year, from 1,213 in April 1922 to over 2,000 in 1923. Buildings could not be built fast enough, and tent homes and businesses appeared. The sudden increase in population drove new demands, and Winnett got its first sidewalks, streets, and water system. Since the oil boom of the 1920s, Winnett has declined both in population and in amenities. Another, smaller oil boom occurred in 1946 when oil was again discovered in Cat Creek.

The Milwaukee Railroad stopped running to Winnett in the early 1970s. The grain elevator is still standing, and graded stretches of land where the tracks used to be are still visible.

The effects of the Bakken oil boom have not had the same effects on Winnett as towns further east such as Glendive or Miles City. However, there have been rumors of oil in other geological formations in the central Montana area near Winnett.

== Geography ==
Winnett is located along Montana Highway 200. Highway 244 connects Winnett to Roundup. According to the United States Census Bureau, the town has a total area of 0.98 square miles (2.54 km^{2}), all land.

Two locations in Winnett are listed on the National Register of Historic Places: Winnett School and Winnett Block.

=== Climate ===
According to the Köppen Climate Classification system, Winnett has a semi-arid climate, abbreviated "BSk" on climate maps.

Climate data for Winnett, 1991–2020 simulated normals (2949 ft elevation)
Month	Jan	Feb	Mar	Apr	May	Jun	Jul	Aug	Sep	Oct	Nov	Dec	Year
Mean daily maximum °F (°C)	34.5 (1.4)	38.1 (3.4)	48.2 (9.0)	58.1 (14.5)	67.5 (19.7)	76.5 (24.7)	87.1 (30.6)	86.7 (30.4)	75.6 (24.2)	60.4 (15.8)	46.6 (8.1)	36.5 (2.5)	59.7 (15.4)
Daily mean °F (°C)	22.8 (−5.1)	25.9 (−3.4)	35.2 (1.8)	44.8 (7.1)	54.1 (12.3)	63.0 (17.2)	71.4 (21.9)	70.2 (21.2)	59.7 (15.4)	46.8 (8.2)	34.2 (1.2)	24.8 (−4.0)	46.1 (7.8)
Mean daily minimum °F (°C)	11.1 (−11.6)	13.8 (−10.1)	22.3 (−5.4)	31.3 (−0.4)	40.8 (4.9)	49.6 (9.8)	55.6 (13.1)	53.6 (12.0)	43.9 (6.6)	32.9 (0.5)	21.7 (−5.7)	13.3 (−10.4)	32.5 (0.3)
Average precipitation inches (mm)	0.45 (11.39)	0.35 (8.80)	0.57 (14.50)	1.33 (33.76)	2.66 (67.59)	2.58 (65.41)	1.47 (37.33)	1.34 (33.92)	1.03 (26.05)	1.15 (29.16)	0.45 (11.51)	0.42 (10.76)	13.8 (350.18)
Average dew point °F (°C)	12.0 (−11.1)	13.8 (−10.1)	20.3 (−6.5)	27.3 (−2.6)	36.3 (2.4)	45.3 (7.4)	47.7 (8.7)	44.4 (6.9)	37.6 (3.1)	29.7 (−1.3)	20.3 (−6.5)	13.5 (−10.3)	29.0 (−1.7)
Source: PRISM Climate Group

== Demographics ==
Historical population
Census	Pop.	Note	%±
1920	316		—
1930	408		29.1%
1940	399		−2.2%
1950	407		2.0%
1960	360		−11.5%
1970	271		−24.7%
1980	207		−23.6%
1990	188		−9.2%
2000	185		−1.6%
2010	182		−1.6%
2020	188		3.3%
U.S. Decennial Census

=== 2010 census ===
As of the census of 2010, there were 182 people, 91 households, and 50 families residing in the town. The population density was 185.7 inhabitants per square mile (71.7/km^{2}). There were 132 housing units at an average density of 134.7 units per square mile (52.0 units/km^{2}). The racial makeup of the town was 100.0% White. Hispanic or Latino of any race were 1.1% of the population.

There were 91 households, of which 22.0% had children under the age of 18 living with them, 47.3% were married couples living together, 6.6% had a female householder with no husband present, 1.1% had a male householder with no wife present, and 45.1% were non-families. 42.9% of all households were made up of individuals, and 19.8% had someone living alone who was 65 years of age or older. The average household size was 2.00 and the average family size was 2.74.

The median age in the town was 50 years. 18.7% of residents were under the age of 18; 3.7% were between the ages of 18 and 24; 19.1% were from 25 to 44; 33.9% were from 45 to 64; and 24.2% were 65 years of age or older. The gender makeup of the town was 53.8% male and 46.2% female.

=== 2000 census ===
As of the census of 2000, there were 185 people, 87 households, and 52 families residing in the town. The population density was 190.4 inhabitants per square mile (73.5/km^{2}). There were 124 housing units at an average density of 127.6 units per square mile (49.3 units/km^{2}). The racial makeup of the town was 99.46% White and 0.54% from two or more races.

There were 87 households, out of which 28.7% had children under the age of 18 living with them, 47.1% were married couples living together, 10.3% had a female householder with no husband present, and 40.2% were non-families. 36.8% of all households were made up of individuals, and 18.4% had someone living alone who was 65 years of age or older. The average household size was 2.13 and the average family size was 2.83.

In the town, the population was spread out, with 23.8% under the age of 18, 5.4% from 18 to 24, 23.8% from 25 to 44, 28.1% from 45 to 64, and 18.9% who were 65 years of age or older. The median age was 43 years. For every 100 females there were 101.1 males. For every 100 females age 18 and over, there were 95.8 males.

The median income for a household in the town was $17,361, and the median income for a family was $26,875. Males had a median income of $21,667 versus $16,250 for females. The per capita income for the town was $10,892. About 23.1% of families and 22.8% of the population were below the poverty line, including 41.5% of those under the age of eighteen and 6.8% of those 65 or over.

== Government ==
Winnett has a mayor and town council. Leo Tarplee was unopposed in the 2025 election for mayor.

== Education ==
Winnett School

Covering the town of Winnett and the surrounding area, Winnett Independent School District has students from grades K-12. They are known as the Rams. In 2006, Winnett Schools was one of 200 nationwide winners of the Blue Ribbon School award.

Petroleum County Community Library serves the area. The local public library offers a once a week pre-school program.
