= Northwest River (Maine) =

Coordinates: 43.85730°N 70.62895°W

Location
- Country: United States

Physical characteristics
- Source
  - location: Maine

The Northwest River is an 8.9-mile-long (14.3 km) tributary of Sebago Lake in Maine.

== See also ==
- List of rivers of Maine
