= Greeley–Weld County Airport =

Airport in Colorado, United States

- IATA: GXY; ICAO: KGXY; FAA LID: GXY

Summary
- Airport type: Public
- Owner: Greeley–Weld County Airport Authority
- Serves: Greeley, Colorado
- Elevation AMSL: 4,697 ft / 1,432 m
- Coordinates: 40°26′15″N 104°37′59″W
- Website: Official website

Map
- Location of airport in Colorado

Runways
Direction	Length		Surface
Direction	ft	m	Surface
17/35	10,000	3,048	Asphalt
10/28	5,801	1,768	Asphalt

Helipads
Number	Length		Surface
Number	ft	m	Surface
H1	20	6	Concrete
H2	20	6	Concrete

Statistics (2018)
- Aircraft operations: 110,660
- Based aircraft: 145
- Source: Federal Aviation Administration

Greeley–Weld County Airport (IATA: GXY, ICAO: KGXY, FAA LID: GXY) is a public use airport located three nautical miles (6 km) east of the central business district of Greeley, a city in Weld County, Colorado, United States. It is owned by the Greeley–Weld County Airport Authority. This airport is included in the National Plan of Integrated Airport Systems for 2011–2015, which categorized it as a general aviation facility.

== History ==
The airport opened in June, 1944, as Greeley Municipal Airport. In September of that year it was dedicated as Crosier Field in honor of World War II aviator Clarence F. "Red" Crosier. Joint ownership by the City of Greeley and Weld County began in 1963, with a new terminal and hangars added throughout that decade. The Greeley–Weld County Airport Authority was established in 1978 and is responsible for operation and development of the airport. A new 10,000-foot (3,000 m) runway and a new terminal were opened in 2000.

Greeley saw commercial airline service beginning in the late 1940's when Challenger Airlines began serving the city as one of many stops on routes between Denver and Billings, MT as well as between Denver and Salt Lake City. Douglas DC-3 aircraft were used. Challenger was merged to become Frontier Airlines (1950-1986) in 1950 but service ended within a few years. Service was also provided in 1969 and 1970 by commuter carrier Trans Central Airlines with flights to Denver using Cessna 402 aircraft.

== Facilities and aircraft ==
According to the "FAA Airport Form 5010 for GXY" (PDF). FAA. , Greeley–Weld County Airport covers an area of 1,198 acres (485 ha) at an elevation of 4,697 feet (1,432 m) above mean sea level. It has two runways with asphalt surfaces: 17/35 is 10,000 by 100 ft (3,048 by 30 m) and 10/28 is 5,801 by 100 ft (1,768 by 30 m). It also has two helipads designated H1 and H2, each with concrete surface measuring 20 by 20 ft (6.1 by 6.1 m).

According to the FAA, for the 12-month period ending December 31, 2018, the airport had 110,660 aircraft operations: 99.5% general aviation and 0.5% military. At that time there were 145 aircraft based at this airport: 121 (83%) single-engine, 16 (11%) multi-engine, 5 (3%) jet, and 5 (3%) helicopter.

The 233rd Space Group (233rd SG) is a unit of the Colorado Air National Guard located at Greeley Air National Guard Station, which is adjacent to the Greeley–Weld County Airport and makes use of its runways.

In an effort to modernize the airport and take advantage of the growth potential on the Front Range, the airport has undertaken upgrades to the ramp, taxiways, and aircraft parking facilities. The project started in the Spring of 2025 and is expected to be finished by October 2025. $1.2 million in grants were received from the FAA to help fund the improvements. City and County officials are also attempting to pursue Part 139 certification.

== See also ==
- List of airports in Colorado
