= Castle Butte =

Castle Butte may refer to:

== Places ==
- Castle Butte, Arizona, unincorporated community
- Castle Butte Township, Pennington County, South Dakota, township
- Castle Butte Township, Perkins County, South Dakota, township

== Buttes ==
- Castle Butte (Saskatchewan), a sandstone and compressed clay outcrop in Saskatchewan, Canada
- Castle Butte (Fergus County), a butte in Fergus County, Montana
- Castle Butte (Garfield County), a butte in Garfield County, Montana
- Castle Butte (Rosebud County), a butte in Rosebud County, Montana
- Castle Butte (Sweet Grass County), a butte in Sweet Grass, Montana
- Castle Butte (Valley County), a butte in Valley County, Montana
- Castle Butte (Yellowstone County), a butte in Yellowstone County, Montana
- Castle Butte (Kern County), a butte in California City, Kern County, California.
- Castle Butte (Valley of the Gods), a butte in Utah
- Castle Dome (butte), a butte near Yuma, Arizona
