= Gold Hill =

Gold Hill may refer to:

== Canada ==
- Gold Hill, British Columbia

== United Kingdom ==
- Gold Hill, Shaftesbury, Dorset, a steep street used in Hovis commercial

== United States ==
Alabama

- Gold Hill, Alabama

Alaska

- Gold Hill Loess a fossiliferous Pleistocene loess in central Alaska

California

- Gold Hill, El Dorado County, California, an unincorporated community
- Gold Hill, Nevada County, California, a former settlement
- Gold Hill, Placer County, California, an unincorporated community
- Gold Hill (Nevada County, California), a hill

Colorado

- Gold Hill, Colorado

Montana

- Gold Hill in Fergus County, Montana
- Gold Hill in Lincoln County, Montana
- Gold Hill in Silver Bow County, Montana
- Gold Hill in Sweet Grass County, Montana

Nevada

- Gold Hill, Nevada, an abandoned mining complex

New Mexico

- Gold Hill (New Mexico), a mountain summit

North Carolina

- Gold Hill, North Carolina

Oregon

- Gold Hill, Oregon

Utah

- Gold Hill, Utah, a former mining complex

Virginia

- Gold Hill, Virginia

== See also ==
- Gold Hill Township (disambiguation)
