= Pine Hill =

Pine Hill or Pine Hills may refer to the following places:

== Places ==
=== Australia ===
- Pine Hill, Queensland, in the Barcaldine Region
- Pine Hills, Queensland, in the Western Downs Region
- Pine Hill Station (Northern Territory)

=== New Zealand ===
- Pine Hill, New Zealand, a suburb, hill, and area of Dunedin
- Pinehill, New Zealand, a suburb of Auckland

=== United States ===
- Pine Hill, Alabama
- Pine Hill, California
- Pine Hill Ecological Reserve, California
- Pine Hills (California), a mountain range
- Pine Hills, California
- Pine Hills, San Diego County, California
- Pine Hills, Florida
- Pine Hill (Columbus, Georgia)
- Pine Hills, Atlanta, Georgia
- Pine Hill (Barnstable County, Massachusetts)
- Pine Hills (Massachusetts), a region in Plymouth
  - The Pinehills, Massachusetts
- Pine Hill (Deer Lodge County, Montana), a mountain in Deer Lodge County, Montana
- Pine Hill (Wibaux County, Montana) a mountain in Wibaux County, Montana
- The Pine Hills, Montana, a mountain range
- Pine Hill, New Jersey
- Pinehill, New Mexico
- Pine Hill, New York, in Ulster County
  - Pine Hill Historic District
  - Pine Hill station
- Pine Hill, Erie County, New York
- Pine Hill (Orleans County, New York), the highest point in Orleans County, New York
- Pine Hills, Albany, New York
- Pine Hill, North Carolina
- Pine Hill (Ashwood, Tennessee), a historic mansion
- Pine Hill, Texas
- Pine Hill Archeological Site, RI-655, in Portsmouth, Rhode Island

=== Elsewhere ===
- Pine Hill, Barbados
- Pine Hill, Belize
- Pine Hill, New Zealand, a suburb of Dunedin

== Other uses ==
- Pine Hills FC, an Australian soccer club

== See also ==
- Pine Hill Airport (disambiguation)
- Pine Hill Cemetery (disambiguation)
- Pine Hill Formation, a geologic formation in New York, US
- Pine Hill Plantation, in Leon County, Florida, US
