= Saddle Butte =

Saddle Butte can refer to several places in the United States.

- Saddle Butte, Montana, a census-designated place
- Saddle Butte (Carter County, Montana) in Carter County, Montana
- Saddle Butte (Hill County, Montana) in Hill County, Montana
- Saddle Butte (Phillips County, Montana) in Phillips County, Montana
- Saddle Butte (Wyoming)
- Saddle Butte (Volcano in Oregon)
