= List of mountains in Richland County, Montana =

There are at least 11 named mountains in Richland County, Montana.

- Antelope Butte, 47°59′30″N 104°14′08″W, el. 2,405 feet (733 m)
- Bell Hill, 47°38′22″N 104°14′03″W, el. 2,018 feet (615 m)
- Blue Hill, 47°57′10″N 104°25′12″W, el. 2,628 feet (801 m)
- Bull Butte, 47°28′37″N 104°06′04″W, el. 2,480 feet (760 m)
- Flag Butte, 47°48′33″N 104°46′07″W, el. 2,736 feet (834 m)
- Haystack Butte, 48°02′25″N 104°56′57″W, el. 2,408 feet (734 m)
- Lindberg Hill, 47°26′32″N 104°09′22″W, el. 2,543 feet (775 m)
- Lone Butte, 47°53′00″N 104°28′05″W, el. 2,572 feet (784 m)
- The Pyramid, 47°31′21″N 104°13′48″W, el. 2,142 feet (653 m)
- Three Buttes, 48°01′53″N 104°25′32″W, el. 2,503 feet (763 m)
- Three Buttes, 47°43′57″N 104°33′35″W, el. 2,723 feet (830 m)

== See also ==
- List of mountains in Montana
- List of mountain ranges in Montana
