= List of mountains in Petroleum County, Montana =

There are at least six named mountains in Petroleum County, Montana.

- Dog Butte, 47°15′39″N 108°19′54″W, el. 2,920 feet (890 m)
- Dovetail Butte, 47°24′11″N 108°16′07″W, el. 3,235 feet (986 m)
- Duff Hill, 47°10′40″N 107°57′13″W, el. 2,667 feet (813 m)
- Rattlesnake Butte, 46°52′22″N 108°10′39″W, el. 3,478 feet (1,060 m)
- Three Buttes, 47°07′55″N 108°43′29″W, el. 3,356 feet (1,023 m)
- Tin Can Hill, 47°11′51″N 108°02′58″W, el. 3,041 feet (927 m)

== See also ==
- List of mountains in Montana
- List of mountain ranges in Montana
