= List of mountains in Musselshell County, Montana =

There are at least 11 named mountains in Musselshell County, Montana.

- Chimney Butte, 46°25′10″N 108°13′39″W, el. 3,658 feet (1,115 m)
- Dunn Mountain, 46°15′14″N 108°19′43″W, el. 4,724 feet (1,440 m)
- Elbow Hill, 46°16′18″N 108°24′40″W, el. 4,058 feet (1,237 m)
- Johnston Mountain, 46°15′28″N 108°22′03″W, el. 4,665 feet (1,422 m)
- Kilby Butte, 46°31′42″N 108°22′07″W, el. 3,527 feet (1,075 m)
- Naderman Buttes, 46°25′04″N 108°47′27″W, el. 3,802 feet (1,159 m)
- Signal Mountain, 46°15′37″N 108°26′54″W, el. 4,153 feet (1,266 m)
- Square Butte, 46°18′36″N 108°13′10″W, el. 4,528 feet (1,380 m)
- Steamboat Rock, 46°36′37″N 108°55′48″W, el. 4,114 feet (1,254 m)
- Three Buttes, 46°18′08″N 108°13′52″W, el. 4,577 feet (1,395 m)
- Timber Buttes, 46°29′41″N 108°51′35″W, el. 3,950 feet (1,200 m)

== See also ==
- List of mountains in Montana
- List of mountain ranges in Montana
