= List of mountains in Roosevelt County, Montana =

There are at least 9 named mountains in Roosevelt County, Montana.

- Bears Nest, 48°26′49″N 105°28′41″W, el. 2,657 feet (810 m)
- Castle Rock, 48°29′21″N 105°36′33″W, el. 2,756 feet (840 m)
- Chris Hill, 48°31′12″N 105°06′29″W, el. 2,684 feet (818 m)
- Clay Butte, 48°16′23″N 104°13′54″W, el. 2,425 feet (739 m)
- Snake Butte, 48°15′45″N 104°10′03″W, el. 2,638 feet (804 m)
- Square Butte, 48°30′47″N 105°13′21″W, el. 2,572 feet (784 m)
- Sugar Top Hill, 48°12′03″N 104°27′33″W, el. 2,287 feet (697 m)
- Twomile Hill, 48°08′11″N 104°57′43″W, el. 2,021 feet (616 m)
- Windy Butte, 48°25′11″N 105°20′08″W, el. 2,539 feet (774 m)

== See also ==
- List of mountains in Montana
- List of mountain ranges in Montana
