= List of mountains in Treasure County, Montana =

There are at least 3 named mountains in Treasure County, Montana.

- Bulldog Butte, 46°02′10″N 107°14′24″W, el. 3,412 feet (1,040 m)
- Rattlesnake Butte, 46°13′45″N 107°04′57″W, el. 3,218 feet (981 m)
- Whiskey Butte, 46°02′20″N 107°13′34″W, el. 3,648 feet (1,112 m)

== See also ==
- List of mountains in Montana
- List of mountain ranges in Montana
