= Gold Hill (Nevada County, California) =

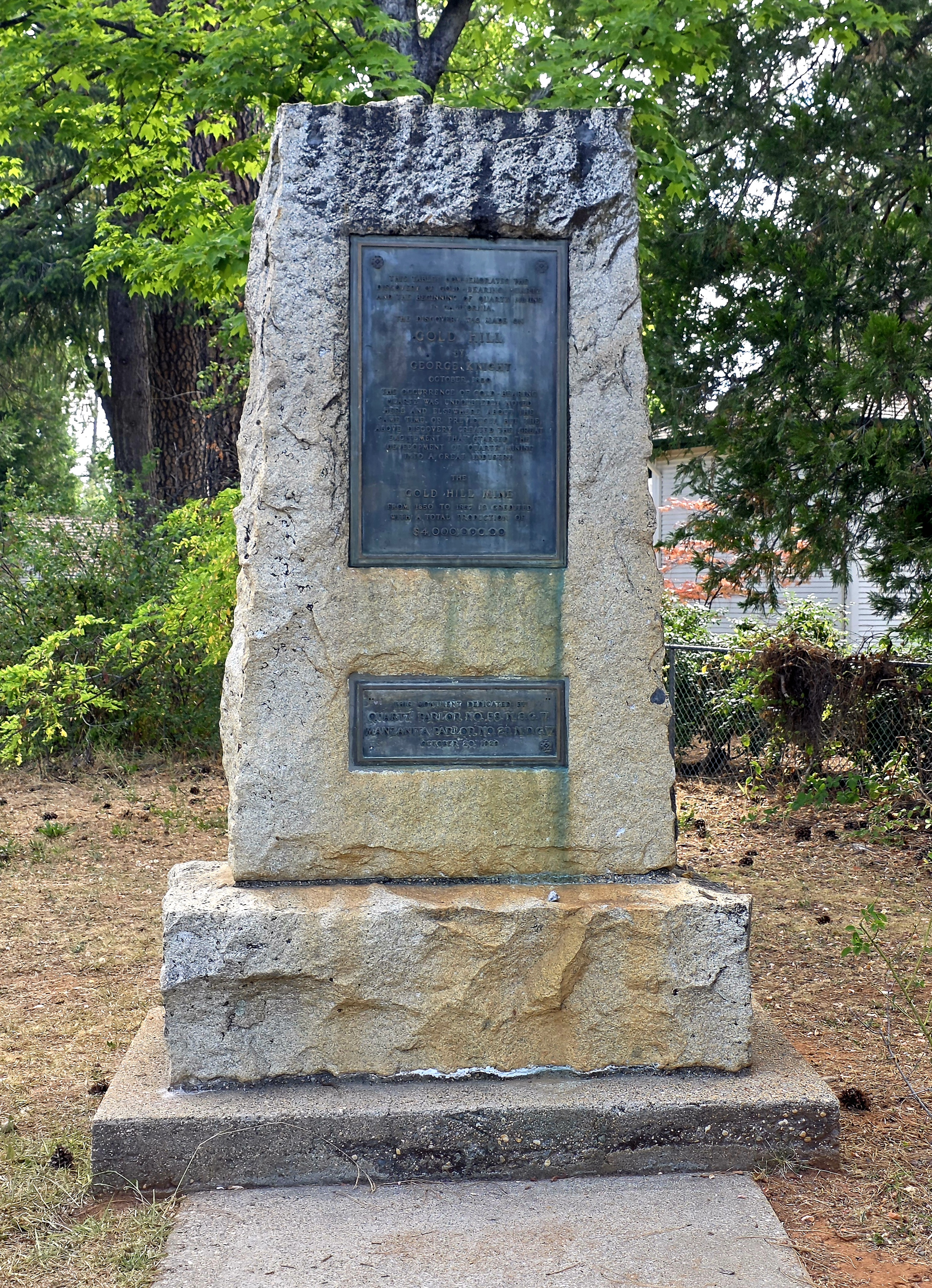
- The Gold Hill monument, built in 1929

- Location within California
- 39°12′47″N 121°4′9″W
- Location: Jenkins Street and Hocking Avenue; Grass Valley, California

History
- Built: 1850

Site notes
- Architect: George Knight

California Historical Landmark
- Official name: Site of one of the first discoveries of quartz gold in California
- Reference no.: 297

Gold Hill in Grass Valley, California, was the site of one of the first discoveries of quartz gold in California. While quartz gold was also found in other areas of Nevada County, California during the same time, it is this find near Wolf Creek that led to quartz-mining frenzy and subsequent creation of the Gold Country quartz-mining industry. The location is honored as a California Historical Landmark.

== History ==
George Knight (sometimes known as McKnight) was a California Gold Rush miner. In October 1850, he was on a Grass Valley hillside when he came across an outcropping of white quartz rock laced with yellow. He pounded the rock with a cast iron skillet and hammer, then washed out the gold. Searching for more gold in the same spot, he dug down into the outcropping and found a 4 inches (10 cm) gold vein. His find was announced by another miner, George Crandall (1825–1908), who ran down to Boston Ravine, a small settlement nearby, with the news.

Knight named the location Gold Hill and his claim became the Gold Hill Mine. He and friends constructed a crude stamp mill made out of the local forest's pine tree logs and equipped it with metal boots. The contraption was propelled by Wolf Creek's rushing water.

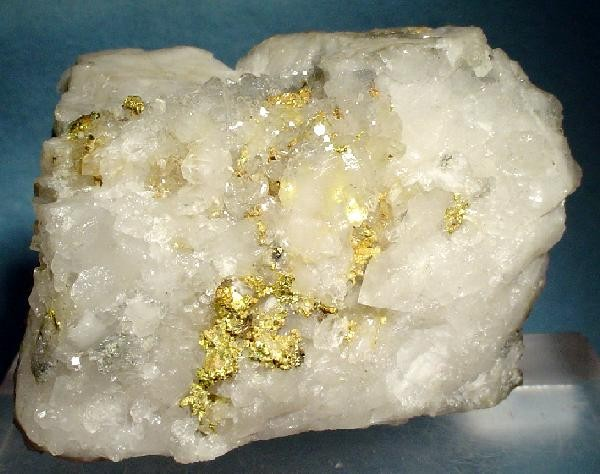
Gold in quartz, from one of the old Grass Valley mines

By March 1851, there were 150 buildings in the area, including hotels, saloons, stores, and even the first school. Before the end of the year, thousands of people had moved to Grass Valley and neighboring Nevada City, California. A fire struck Grass Valley on September 13, 1855, destroying the entire town of over 300 wooden buildings, but it was soon rebuilt with safer materials.

While Gold Hill Mine produced $4,000,000 between 1850–1857, it "pinched out" by 1864 and closed.

A 1940 geological survey of the Gold Hill Quartz Mine reported the host rock to be Diabase and Granodiorite and the mineral list showed gold, pyrite, and quartz.

== Historical landmark ==
The site is honored as California Historical Landmark number 297. The plaque on the monument, located on the southwest corner of Jenkins Street and Hocking Avenue in Grass Valley reads:

This tablet commemorates the discovery of gold-bearing quartz and the beginning of quartz mining in California. The discovery was made on Gold Hill by George Knight in October 1850. The occurrence of gold-bearing quartz was undoubtedly noted here and elsewhere about the same time or even earlier, but this discovery created the great excitement that started the development of quartz mining into a great industry. The Gold Hill Mine is credited with a total production of $4,000,000 between 1850 and 1857.

The plaque and monument were erected by the Native Sons of the Golden West in 1929.

== See also ==
- Omega Hydraulic Diggings
- California Historical Landmarks in Nevada County
