= West Peak (Fergus County, Montana) =

Mountain in Montana, United States

- Location within Montana

Highest point
- Elevation: 8,186 feet (2,495 m)
- Coordinates: 46°46′47″N 109°32′11″W

Geography
- Location: Fergus County, Montana
- Parent range: Big Snowy Mountains

West Peak, el. 8,186 feet (2,495 m), is a mountain peak in an island range, the Big Snowy Mountains in Fergus County, Montana. It is the westernmost peak in the range. The peak is located in the Lewis and Clark National Forest and accessible via the Crystal Lake National Recreational Trail. Tributaries of the Judith and Musselshell Rivers flow from its slopes. The Devil's Chute Ice Cave, a popular attraction, is located on the northeast face of the peak.

== See also ==
- Mountains of Fergus County, Montana
