= List of mountains in Montana =

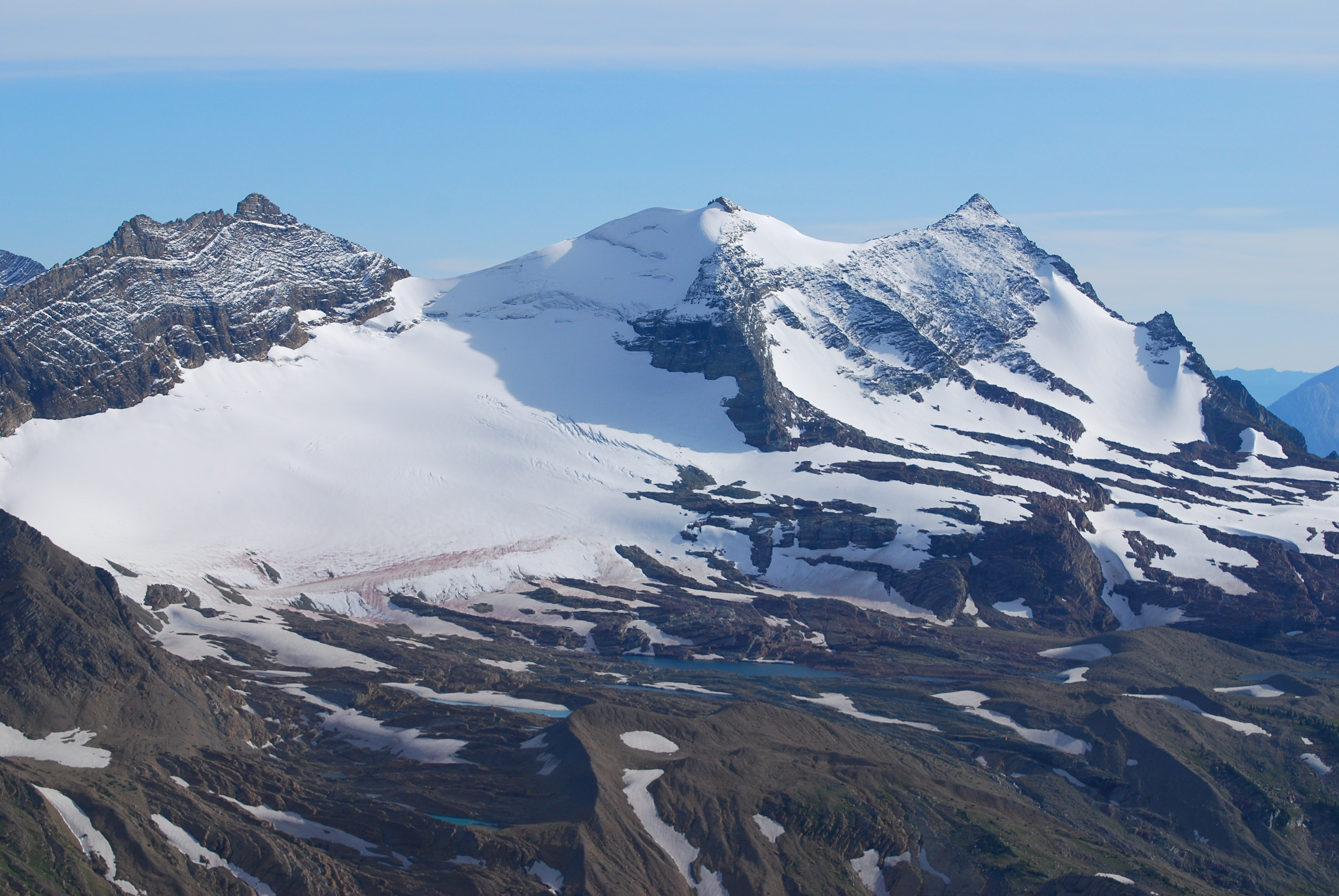
Gunsight Mountain, Flathead County

This is a list of mountains in the state of Montana. Montana is the fourth largest state in the United States and is particularly mountainous. The name "Montana" means mountainous in Latin. Representative James Mitchell Ashley (R-Ohio), suggested the name when legislation organizing the territory was passed by the United States Congress in 1864. Ashley noted that a mining camp in the Colorado Territory had already used the name, and Congress agreed to use the name for the new territory.

According to the United States Board on Geographic Names there are at least 2991 named mountains (hills, summits, buttes, peaks, etc.) in Montana. This is a list of lists of named mountain peaks in Montana by county.

- List of mountains in Beaverhead County, Montana
- List of mountains in Big Horn County, Montana
- List of mountains in Blaine County, Montana
- List of mountains in Broadwater County, Montana
- List of mountains in Carbon County, Montana
- List of mountains in Carter County, Montana
- List of mountains in Cascade County, Montana
- List of mountains in Chouteau County, Montana
- List of mountains in Custer County, Montana
- List of mountains in Daniels County, Montana
- List of mountains in Dawson County, Montana
- List of mountains in Deer Lodge County, Montana
- List of mountains in Fallon County, Montana
- List of mountains in Fergus County, Montana
- List of mountains in Flathead County, Montana (A-L)
- List of mountains in Flathead County, Montana (M-Z)
- List of mountains in Gallatin County, Montana
- List of mountains in Garfield County, Montana
- List of mountains in Glacier County, Montana
- List of mountains in Golden Valley County, Montana
- List of mountains in Granite County, Montana
- List of mountains in Hill County, Montana
- List of mountains in Jefferson County, Montana
- List of mountains in Judith Basin County, Montana
- List of mountains in Lake County, Montana
- List of mountains in Lewis and Clark County, Montana
- List of mountains in Liberty County, Montana
- List of mountains in Lincoln County, Montana (A-L)
- List of mountains in Lincoln County, Montana (M-Z)
- List of mountains in Madison County, Montana
- List of mountains in McCone County, Montana
- List of mountains in Meagher County, Montana
- List of mountains in Mineral County, Montana
- List of mountains in Missoula County, Montana
- List of mountains in Musselshell County, Montana
- List of mountains in Park County, Montana
- List of mountains in Petroleum County, Montana
- List of mountains in Phillips County, Montana
- List of mountains in Pondera County, Montana
- List of mountains in Powder River County, Montana
- List of mountains in Powell County, Montana
- List of mountains in Prairie County, Montana
- List of mountains in Ravalli County, Montana
- List of mountains in Richland County, Montana
- List of mountains in Roosevelt County, Montana
- List of mountains in Rosebud County, Montana
- List of mountains in Sanders County, Montana
- List of mountains in Sheridan County, Montana
- List of mountains in Silver Bow County, Montana
- List of mountains in Stillwater County, Montana
- List of mountains in Sweet Grass County, Montana
- List of mountains in Teton County, Montana
- List of mountains in Toole County, Montana
- List of mountains in Treasure County, Montana
- List of mountains in Wheatland County, Montana
- List of mountains in Wibaux County, Montana
- List of mountains in Valley County, Montana
- List of mountains in Yellowstone County, Montana

== See also ==
- List of mountain ranges in Montana
- Mountain passes in Montana (A-L)
