= List of mountains in Blaine County, Montana =

There are at least 51 named mountains in Blaine County, Montana.

- Barber Butte, 48°16′38″N 109°25′29″W, el. 5,007 feet (1,526 m)
- Belcher Peak, 48°09′29″N 109°06′56″W, el. 4,757 feet (1,450 m)
- Birch Creek Hill, 47°45′33″N 109°32′03″W, el. 3,278 feet (999 m)
- Bird Tail Butte, 48°08′29″N 109°15′21″W, el. 4,370 feet (1,330 m)
- Black Butte, 47°50′33″N 109°10′38″W, el. 3,173 feet (967 m)
- Black Butte, 48°12′41″N 108°34′24″W, el. 2,831 feet (863 m)
- Black Butte, 48°12′47″N 109°11′26″W, el. 5,522 feet (1,683 m)
- Blue Stone Peak, 48°03′36″N 109°28′52″W, el. 4,764 feet (1,452 m)
- Chimney Butte, 48°01′31″N 109°09′13″W, el. 3,366 feet (1,026 m)
- Coming Day Butte, 47°58′43″N 108°29′27″W, el. 4,984 feet (1,519 m)
- Corrigan Mountain, 48°09′36″N 109°20′58″W, el. 5,367 feet (1,636 m)
- Crown Butte, 48°16′44″N 109°14′19″W, el. 4,741 feet (1,445 m)
- Damon Hill, 47°55′56″N 108°37′40″W, el. 4,741 feet (1,445 m)
- Eagle Child Mountain, 47°55′39″N 108°41′09″W, el. 5,213 feet (1,589 m)
- East Butte, 48°44′37″N 108°48′49″W, el. 3,304 feet (1,007 m)
- Echo Butte, 47°58′37″N 109°30′51″W, el. 3,983 feet (1,214 m)
- Elkhorn Mountain, 48°03′31″N 109°29′57″W, el. 4,793 feet (1,461 m)
- Goat Mountain, 48°00′53″N 109°15′51″W, el. 4,039 feet (1,231 m)
- Gumbo Butte, 48°00′43″N 109°09′59″W, el. 3,560 feet (1,090 m)
- Hansen Butte, 48°11′05″N 109°09′08″W, el. 5,010 feet (1,530 m)
- Haystack Butte, 48°07′53″N 108°55′03″W, el. 3,294 feet (1,004 m)
- Index Butte, 48°03′04″N 109°29′16″W, el. 4,459 feet (1,359 m)
- Iron Butte, 48°15′37″N 109°04′52″W, el. 4,701 feet (1,433 m)
- Johnson Butte, 48°11′34″N 109°10′51″W, el. 5,253 feet (1,601 m)
- Lion Butte, 47°53′37″N 109°19′19″W, el. 3,435 feet (1,047 m)
- Lloyd Butte, 48°16′55″N 109°20′43″W, el. 4,934 feet (1,504 m)
- Lookout Butte, 48°09′30″N 109°05′54″W, el. 4,852 feet (1,479 m)
- Mans Head Rock, 48°18′56″N 109°20′30″W, el. 4,285 feet (1,306 m)
- McCann Butte, 48°17′54″N 109°03′23″W, el. 4,291 feet (1,308 m)
- Middle Butte, 48°47′34″N 108°52′31″W, el. 3,445 feet (1,050 m)
- Miles Butte, 48°15′54″N 109°03′17″W, el. 4,944 feet (1,507 m)
- Mission Peak, 47°55′13″N 108°37′30″W, el. 5,525 feet (1,684 m)
- Mouse Butte, 48°01′50″N 108°37′09″W, el. 4,278 feet (1,304 m)
- Murphy Butte, 48°12′08″N 109°25′38″W, el. 5,449 feet (1,661 m)
- Myrtle Butte, 48°14′06″N 109°03′49″W, el. 5,197 feet (1,584 m)
- Rabbit Hills, 48°41′15″N 109°12′33″W, el. 2,634 feet (803 m)
- Rattlesnake Butte, 48°08′12″N 109°05′36″W, el. 4,114 feet (1,254 m)
- Rieve Butte, 48°11′01″N 109°08′09″W, el. 5,134 feet (1,565 m)
- Saddle Rock, 47°58′53″N 109°26′06″W, el. 3,950 feet (1,200 m)
- Sawtooth Mountain, 48°04′03″N 109°24′05″W, el. 5,177 feet (1,578 m)
- Sayer Butte, 48°23′29″N 109°17′52″W, el. 3,747 feet (1,142 m)
- Scotty Butte, 48°11′08″N 109°13′09″W, el. 4,888 feet (1,490 m)
- Snake Butte, 48°22′25″N 108°51′24″W, el. 3,110 feet (950 m)
- Spirit Woman Butte, 48°01′05″N 108°51′00″W, el. 3,360 feet (1,020 m)
- Suction Butte, 48°11′32″N 109°06′25″W, el. 5,305 feet (1,617 m)
- Taylor Butte, 48°12′12″N 109°13′42″W, el. 4,783 feet (1,458 m)
- Thunder Butte, 48°13′16″N 109°07′27″W, el. 5,384 feet (1,641 m)
- Timber Butte, 48°15′18″N 109°14′20″W, el. 5,344 feet (1,629 m)
- West Butte, 48°51′00″N 108°56′03″W, el. 3,474 feet (1,059 m)
- Wild Horse Butte, 48°15′30″N 108°44′29″W, el. 3,235 feet (986 m)
- Williamson Butte, 48°01′16″N 109°19′11″W, el. 4,534 feet (1,382 m)

== See also ==
- List of mountains in Montana
- List of mountain ranges in Montana
