= Pine Hill Cemetery =

Pine Hill Cemetery may refer to:

- Pine Hill Cemetery (Davenport, Iowa)
- Pine Hill Cemetery (Dover, New Hampshire)

== See also ==
- Pine Hill (disambiguation)
