= List of mountains in Golden Valley County, Montana =

There are at least 9 named mountains in Golden Valley County, Montana.

- Antelope Butte, 46°12′37″N 109°01′46″W, el. 3,993 feet (1,217 m)
- Chinamans Hat, 46°12′52″N 109°31′44″W, el. 4,068 feet (1,240 m)
- Haystack Butte, 46°12′37″N 109°07′23″W, el. 3,901 feet (1,189 m)
- Lost Peak, 46°43′48″N 109°15′42″W, el. 8,192 feet (2,497 m)
- Mount Sinai, 46°10′25″N 109°14′17″W, el. 4,386 feet (1,337 m)
- O'Brien Hill, 46°10′15″N 109°26′12″W, el. 4,642 feet (1,415 m)
- Red Hill, 46°43′55″N 109°11′12″W, el. 6,155 feet (1,876 m)
- Sahara Hill, 46°40′39″N 109°05′08″W, el. 5,341 feet (1,628 m)
- Tepee Point, 46°44′56″N 109°22′17″W, el. 8,399 feet (2,560 m)

== See also ==
- List of mountains in Montana
- List of mountain ranges in Montana
