= List of mountains in Cascade County, Montana =

There are at least 78 named mountains in Cascade County, Montana.

- Adel Mountain, 47°04′34″N 111°42′24″W, el. 7,096 feet (2,163 m)
- Antelope Butte, 47°26′34″N 111°25′36″W, el. 3,724 feet (1,135 m)
- Antelope Mountain, 47°14′49″N 111°47′07″W, el. 5,157 feet (1,572 m)
- Baldy, 47°01′13″N 111°47′03″W, el. 5,617 feet (1,712 m)
- Barker Mountain, 47°05′22″N 110°40′23″W, el. 8,307 feet (2,532 m)
- Belt Butte, 47°22′52″N 110°53′04″W, el. 4,646 feet (1,416 m)
- Belt Park Butte, 46°58′23″N 110°49′21″W, el. 6,968 feet (2,124 m)
- Big Horn Mountain, 47°03′17″N 110°53′52″W, el. 7,671 feet (2,338 m)
- Birdtail Butte, 47°20′29″N 111°57′26″W, el. 4,934 feet (1,504 m)
- Black Butte, 47°07′46″N 111°13′13″W, el. 6,339 feet (1,932 m)
- Black Butte, 47°17′09″N 111°52′41″W, el. 5,276 feet (1,608 m)
- Black Mountain, 47°07′11″N 111°43′11″W, el. 5,981 feet (1,823 m)
- Blankenbaker Hill, 47°15′52″N 111°04′24″W, el. 4,340 feet (1,320 m)
- Cascade Butte, 47°18′32″N 111°45′17″W, el. 4,495 feet (1,370 m)
- Castle Rock, 47°06′55″N 111°34′37″W, el. 5,646 feet (1,721 m)
- China Mountain, 47°16′42″N 111°52′28″W, el. 5,220 feet (1,590 m)
- Chisholm Mountain, 47°09′54″N 111°50′32″W, el. 4,596 feet (1,401 m)
- Comers Butte, 47°24′10″N 110°42′20″W, el. 5,413 feet (1,650 m)
- Creamery Hill, 47°14′44″N 111°08′49″W, el. 4,403 feet (1,342 m)
- Crown Butte, 47°26′09″N 111°55′44″W, el. 4,695 feet (1,431 m)
- Crown Butte, 47°08′14″N 110°59′31″W, el. 6,676 feet (2,035 m)
- Deer Butte, 47°06′16″N 111°11′24″W, el. 6,306 feet (1,922 m)
- DeLacey Point, 47°09′40″N 111°49′33″W, el. 3,553 feet (1,083 m)
- Dime Hill, 47°19′44″N 111°50′18″W, el. 3,786 feet (1,154 m)
- Eagle Rock, 47°07′26″N 111°52′40″W, el. 4,429 feet (1,350 m)
- Eagle Rock, 47°23′42″N 111°54′52″W, el. 3,966 feet (1,209 m)
- Elephant Head Rock, location unknown, el. 3,425 feet (1,044 m)
- Finigan Mountain, 47°14′01″N 111°47′53″W, el. 5,361 feet (1,634 m)
- Fishback Butte, 47°19′48″N 111°54′22″W, el. 4,908 feet (1,496 m)
- Forest Hill, 47°16′56″N 111°05′50″W, el. 4,222 feet (1,287 m)
- Frozen Hill, location unknown, el. 3,425 feet (1,044 m)
- Gobbler Knob, 47°24′38″N 111°07′42″W, el. 3,760 feet (1,150 m)
- Gore Hill, 47°29′11″N 111°20′53″W, el. 3,533 feet (1,077 m)
- Harris Mountain, 47°09′56″N 111°42′11″W, el. 5,922 feet (1,805 m)
- Haystack Butte, 47°20′12″N 111°55′31″W, el. 4,954 feet (1,510 m)
- Hill Fifty-seven, 47°31′29″N 111°20′08″W, el. 3,586 feet (1,093 m)
- Indian Butte, 47°31′36″N 111°15′46″W, el. 3,570 feet (1,090 m)
- Iron Hill, 47°25′24″N 111°59′21″W, el. 4,304 feet (1,312 m)
- Iverson Hill, 47°20′28″N 111°19′36″W, el. 4,012 feet (1,223 m)
- Johnson Butte, 47°17′23″N 111°50′06″W, el. 4,629 feet (1,411 m)
- Keegan Peak, 46°59′59″N 110°49′51″W, el. 6,998 feet (2,133 m)
- Lionhead Butte, 47°19′54″N 111°58′54″W, el. 4,797 feet (1,462 m)
- Long Mountain, 46°56′37″N 110°41′32″W, el. 8,612 feet (2,625 m)
- Mahoney Hill, 47°16′47″N 111°04′15″W, el. 4,295 feet (1,309 m)
- Millegan Hill, 47°02′50″N 111°22′13″W, el. 4,957 feet (1,511 m)
- Mission Hill, 47°19′13″N 111°51′59″W, el. 4,094 feet (1,248 m)
- Monarch Mountain, 47°03′40″N 110°49′56″W, el. 6,050 feet (1,840 m)
- Mount Cecelia, 47°15′24″N 111°50′39″W, el. 6,132 feet (1,869 m)
- Mount Pilgrim, 47°00′05″N 110°58′45″W, el. 7,221 feet (2,201 m)
- Neihart Baldy, 46°56′31″N 110°42′32″W, el. 8,284 feet (2,525 m)
- Nipple Butte, location unknown, el. 3,425 feet (1,044 m)
- Pinewood Peak, 47°26′12″N 110°39′41″W, el. 6,831 feet (2,082 m)
- Powderhouse Hill, 47°20′45″N 111°10′02″W, el. 3,835 feet (1,169 m)
- Prospect Hill, location unknown, el. 3,425 feet (1,044 m)
- Rattlesnake Butte, 47°11′17″N 110°51′50″W, el. 5,774 feet (1,760 m)
- Rattlesnake Hill, 47°30′18″N 110°56′00″W, el. 3,688 feet (1,124 m)
- Red Butte, 47°21′38″N 111°13′30″W, el. 4,170 feet (1,270 m)
- Rocky Butte, 47°21′50″N 111°59′10″W, el. 4,688 feet (1,429 m)
- Saddleback Butte, 47°17′25″N 111°54′00″W, el. 4,682 feet (1,427 m)
- Sawmill Peak, 47°14′01″N 111°53′25″W, el. 6,089 feet (1,856 m)
- Servoss Mountain, 47°03′00″N 110°44′04″W, el. 7,211 feet (2,198 m)
- Shaw Butte, 47°27′32″N 111°50′14″W, el. 4,632 feet (1,412 m)
- Skull Butte, 47°17′22″N 111°51′46″W, el. 5,659 feet (1,725 m)
- Smelter Hill, 47°31′16″N 111°16′09″W, el. 3,409 feet (1,039 m)
- South Peak, 47°22′21″N 110°38′23″W, el. 7,077 feet (2,157 m)
- Square Butte, 47°26′30″N 111°44′50″W, el. 4,728 feet (1,441 m)
- Streeter Hill, 47°05′48″N 111°25′14″W, el. 4,977 feet (1,517 m)
- Sugarloaf Mountain, 47°09′58″N 111°54′24″W, el. 5,420 feet (1,650 m)
- Sullivan Hill, 47°17′23″N 112°00′32″W, el. 5,489 feet (1,673 m)
- Sun Mountain, 47°03′23″N 110°46′36″W, el. 6,532 feet (1,991 m)
- Taft Hill, 47°29′16″N 111°31′52″W, el. 3,806 feet (1,160 m)
- Telegraph Mountain, 47°15′52″N 111°54′12″W, el. 5,807 feet (1,770 m)
- The Sawteeth, 47°05′32″N 111°46′12″W, el. 6,401 feet (1,951 m)
- Thunder Mountain, 47°01′39″N 110°54′28″W, el. 8,123 feet (2,476 m)
- Tiger Butte, 47°09′34″N 111°00′40″W, el. 6,991 feet (2,131 m)
- Turtle Butte, 47°04′49″N 111°32′41″W, el. 4,373 feet (1,333 m)
- Warner Hill, 47°15′47″N 111°52′01″W, el. 4,902 feet (1,494 m)
- Wilson Butte, 47°23′58″N 111°22′55″W, el. 3,848 feet (1,173 m)

== See also ==
- List of mountains in Montana
- List of mountain ranges in Montana
