= List of mountains in Toole County, Montana =

There are at least 8 named mountains in Toole County, Montana.

- Black Butte, 48°41′11″N 111°30′14″W, el. 3,304 feet (1,007 m)
- Gold Butte, 48°50′54″N 111°22′31″W, el. 6,486 feet (1,977 m)
- Grassy Butte, 48°46′17″N 111°19′43″W, el. 4,318 feet (1,316 m)
- Jackass Butte, 48°52′19″N 111°26′01″W, el. 4,413 feet (1,345 m)
- Jerusalem Rocks, 48°57′30″N 111°58′03″W, el. 3,576 feet (1,090 m)
- Middle Butte, 48°51′55″N 111°22′00″W, el. 5,472 feet (1,668 m)
- Raglan Butte, 48°42′40″N 111°48′40″W, el. 3,583 feet (1,092 m)
- West Butte, 48°55′54″N 111°32′01″W, el. 6,936 feet (2,114 m)

== See also ==
- List of mountains in Montana
- List of mountain ranges in Montana
