= List of mountains in Valley County, Montana =

There are at least 20 named mountains in Valley County, Montana.

- Castle Butte, 47°49′31″N 107°23′18″W, el. 2,917 feet (889 m)
- Coal Mine Hill, 48°52′55″N 106°30′45″W, el. 3,304 feet (1,007 m)
- Dead Mans Hill, 48°12′52″N 107°16′43″W, el. 2,395 feet (730 m)
- Glass Hill, 48°52′57″N 106°15′47″W, el. 3,150 feet (960 m)
- Graveyard Hill, 47°46′54″N 106°52′22″W, el. 2,726 feet (831 m)
- Johnnys Hill, 48°44′17″N 106°05′12″W, el. 3,051 feet (930 m)
- Kaminski Hill, 48°56′54″N 106°11′38″W, el. 3,107 feet (947 m)
- Landre Hills, 48°33′37″N 106°56′07″W, el. 2,595 feet (791 m)
- Laundry Hill, 48°32′18″N 106°49′45″W, el. 2,963 feet (903 m)
- Lighthouse Hill, 48°53′03″N 106°49′02″W, el. 2,746 feet (837 m)
- Lookout, 48°29′28″N 106°24′07″W, el. 2,986 feet (910 m)
- Murray Hill, 47°48′37″N 107°02′39″W, el. 2,877 feet (877 m)
- Round Butte, 48°53′39″N 106°21′52″W, el. 3,159 feet (963 m)
- Round Butte, 48°53′44″N 106°35′22″W, el. 2,946 feet (898 m)
- Seventh Point Buttes, 47°49′54″N 106°41′39″W, el. 2,651 feet (808 m)
- Spencer Point, 48°15′53″N 107°16′08″W, el. 2,411 feet (735 m)
- Three Buttes, 48°08′33″N 105°55′33″W, el. 2,300 feet (700 m)
- Tiger Butte, 48°07′31″N 106°31′56″W, el. 2,339 feet (713 m)
- Two Buttes, 47°58′23″N 106°46′40″W, el. 2,244 feet (684 m)
- White Highland Hills, 48°44′56″N 106°06′18″W, el. 3,094 feet (943 m)

== See also ==
- List of mountains in Montana
- List of mountain ranges in Montana
