= List of mountains in Dawson County, Montana =

There are 13 named mountain summits in Dawson County, Montana.

- Blue Mountain, 46°57′29″N 104°35′34″W, el. 2,946 feet (898 m)
- Bryants Buttes, 47°08′22″N 104°38′07″W, el. 2,434 feet (742 m)
- Clay Butte, 47°34′22″N 104°56′43″W, el. 3,113 feet (949 m)
- Cluster Buttes, 47°09′39″N 104°21′20″W, el. 2,602 feet (793 m)
- Crazy Butte, 47°21′45″N 105°21′05″W, el. 2,854 feet (870 m)
- Custers Lookout, 47°10′10″N 104°43′22″W, el. 2,362 feet (720 m)
- Diamond G Butte, 47°00′51″N 105°19′15″W, el. 3,205 feet (977 m)
- Glendive Butte, 47°12′30″N 104°46′12″W, el. 2,631 feet (802 m)
- High Point, 47°18′00″N 105°17′36″W, el. 3,300 feet (1,000 m)
- Mount Antelope, 47°16′06″N 105°23′55″W, el. 3,461 feet (1,055 m)
- Rattlesnake Butte, 46°52′24″N 104°35′48″W, el. 2,680 feet (820 m)
- Twin Buttes, 47°19′23″N 104°57′19″W, el. 2,769 feet (844 m)
- Woodworth Hill, 47°26′52″N 105°22′47″W, el. 2,664 feet (812 m)

== See also ==
- List of mountains in Montana
- List of mountain ranges in Montana
