= List of mountains in Lake County, Montana =

There are at least 47 named mountains in Lake County, Montana.

- Anderson Peak, el. 7,703 feet (2,348 m)
- Antelope Butte, el. 4,718 feet (1,438 m)
- Bandbox Mountain, el. 8,097 feet (2,468 m)
- Big Baldy Mountain, el. 9,183 feet (2,799 m)
- Big Deer Point, el. 8,146 feet (2,483 m)
- Black Buttes, el. 4,528 feet (1,380 m)
- Blacktail Hills, el. 5,732 feet (1,747 m)
- Burley Peak, el. 6,220 feet (1,900 m)
- Butcherknife Mountain, el. 7,930 feet (2,420 m)
- Cabin Mountain, el. 8,189 feet (2,496 m)
- Clendenin Mountain, el. 7,805 feet (2,379 m)
- Coyote Peak, el. 7,966 feet (2,428 m)
- Gibson Peak, el. 8,054 feet (2,455 m)
- Granite Mountain, el. 7,634 feet (2,327 m)
- Grendah Mountain, el. 8,176 feet (2,492 m)
- Indian Buttes, el. 4,229 feet (1,289 m)
- Indian Hill, el. 6,178 feet (1,883 m)
- Irene Peak, el. 7,211 feet (2,198 m)
- Kelly Mountain, el. 8,146 feet (2,483 m)
- Lava Peak, el. 7,132 feet (2,174 m)
- Limestone Butte, el. 5,843 feet (1,781 m)
- Marys Knoll, el. 6,243 feet (1,903 m)
- Middle Peak, el. 7,018 feet (2,139 m)
- Mixes Baldy, el. 7,940 feet (2,420 m)
- North Peak, el. 6,916 feet (2,108 m)
- Otter Mountain, el. 6,683 feet (2,037 m)
- Peterson Mountain, el. 7,569 feet (2,307 m)
- Peterson Mountain, el. 7,707 feet (2,349 m)
- Pine Knob, el. 6,296 feet (1,919 m)
- Red Hill, el. 5,974 feet (1,821 m)
- Reed Hill, el. 6,535 feet (1,992 m)
- Sand Point, el. 8,218 feet (2,505 m)
- Sheep Mountain, el. 7,999 feet (2,438 m)
- Skull Butte, el. 5,364 feet (1,635 m)
- Slide Rock Point, el. 8,133 feet (2,479 m)
- Steamboat Butte, el. 4,652 feet (1,418 m)
- Stevens Butte, el. 6,542 feet (1,994 m)
- Taylor Mountain, el. 7,693 feet (2,345 m)
- Taylor Peak, el. 7,789 feet (2,374 m)
- Tepee Butte, el. 8,228 feet (2,508 m)
- Tepee Butte, el. 6,647 feet (2,026 m)
- Tollgate Mountain, el. 7,782 feet (2,372 m)
- Tucken Mountain, el. 7,572 feet (2,308 m)
- Twin Sisters, el. 7,395 feet (2,254 m)
- Wolf Butte, el. 6,690 feet (2,040 m)
- Woodhurst Mountain, el. 7,382 feet (2,250 m)
- Yogo Peak, el. 8,812 feet (2,686 m)

== See also ==
- List of mountains in Montana
- List of mountain ranges in Montana

== Notes ==
47°03′57″N 110°36′15″W 47°10′12″N 110°16′24″W 46°57′55″N 110°28′59″W 46°58′07″N 110°36′23″W 46°52′41″N 110°36′59″W 47°21′21″N 110°33′55″W 47°03′08″N 110°24′54″W 46°44′43″N 110°18′37″W 47°01′06″N 110°33′55″W 46°54′25″N 110°35′14″W 47°05′53″N 110°36′43″W 46°52′32″N 110°35′21″W 46°59′47″N 110°28′04″W 47°05′14″N 110°29′50″W 46°51′01″N 110°37′07″W 47°08′29″N 109°52′08″W 46°47′46″N 110°17′10″W 47°06′15″N 110°39′55″W 46°53′31″N 110°29′34″W 47°24′21″N 110°32′00″W 47°10′43″N 110°41′13″W 46°59′41″N 110°16′28″W 47°23′55″N 110°36′38″W 47°05′08″N 110°36′38″W 47°24′50″N 110°36′06″W 47°07′26″N 110°42′41″W 47°07′35″N 110°34′58″W 47°07′27″N 110°34′56″W 46°51′48″N 110°12′37″W 46°52′47″N 110°12′33″W 46°56′09″N 110°15′48″W 46°48′17″N 110°32′30″W 46°56′42″N 110°27′29″W 47°04′44″N 110°15′56″W 46°53′38″N 110°36′53″W 47°07′00″N 110°16′26″W 46°43′16″N 109°53′15″W 47°03′59″N 110°31′31″W 47°04′14″N 110°31′11″W 46°55′13″N 110°34′52″W 46°56′27″N 110°18′59″W 46°55′52″N 110°22′34″W 46°59′04″N 110°29′02″W 46°45′19″N 110°02′38″W 47°06′49″N 110°28′07″W 46°58′44″N 110°20′04″W 46°55′37″N 110°32′44″W
