= List of mountains in Powder River County, Montana =

There are at least 65 named mountains in Powder River County, Montana.

- Antelope Butte, 45°40′01″N 105°02′19″W, el. 3,225 feet (983 m)
- Bailey Hill, 45°19′02″N 105°52′11″W, el. 4,206 feet (1,282 m)
- Baldy Peak, 45°12′36″N 105°31′33″W, el. 4,249 feet (1,295 m)
- Bear Skull Mountain, 45°08′18″N 105°26′40″W, el. 4,258 feet (1,298 m)
- Bell Tower, 45°09′01″N 105°19′07″W, el. 3,383 feet (1,031 m)
- Black Eagle Butte, 45°00′21″N 105°59′44″W, el. 4,088 feet (1,246 m)
- Buffalo Butte, 45°29′51″N 105°03′49″W, el. 3,517 feet (1,072 m)
- Castle Rock, 45°17′06″N 105°24′50″W, el. 3,474 feet (1,059 m)
- Castle Rock, 45°24′33″N 105°42′38″W, el. 3,898 feet (1,188 m)
- Castle Rock, 45°45′42″N 105°53′35″W, el. 3,458 feet (1,054 m)
- Chico Buttes, 45°05′24″N 106°10′27″W, el. 4,134 feet (1,260 m)
- Cook Mountain, 45°38′09″N 106°09′45″W, el. 4,206 feet (1,282 m)
- Deer Creek Buttes, 45°34′37″N 105°12′42″W, el. 3,327 feet (1,014 m)
- Deranleau Butte, 45°21′03″N 105°06′20″W, el. 3,606 feet (1,099 m)
- Diamond Butte, 45°14′57″N 105°55′59″W, el. 4,268 feet (1,301 m)
- Dog Butte, 45°18′14″N 105°25′05″W, el. 3,501 feet (1,067 m)
- Dry Creek Butte, 45°16′06″N 105°12′20″W, el. 3,717 feet (1,133 m)
- East Fork Buttes, 45°21′33″N 105°11′56″W, el. 3,671 feet (1,119 m)
- Eldon Mountain, 45°15′38″N 105°24′53″W, el. 3,845 feet (1,172 m)
- Fighting Butte, 45°19′06″N 105°19′39″W, el. 3,278 feet (999 m)
- Fivemile Hill, 45°29′20″N 105°29′09″W, el. 3,461 feet (1,055 m)
- Gardner Butte, 45°19′25″N 105°52′09″W, el. 4,285 feet (1,306 m)
- Gobbler Knob, 45°05′17″N 106°02′29″W, el. 4,190 feet (1,280 m)
- Goodspeed Butte, 45°18′42″N 106°02′06″W, el. 3,963 feet (1,208 m)
- Haystack Butte, 45°30′10″N 105°41′38″W, el. 3,507 feet (1,069 m)
- Home Creek Butte, 45°36′08″N 105°56′13″W, el. 4,409 feet (1,344 m)
- Kelsey Hill, 45°03′04″N 105°51′58″W, el. 3,674 feet (1,120 m)
- Lideen Hill, 45°18′46″N 105°23′27″W, el. 3,520 feet (1,070 m)
- Lightning Butte, 45°23′46″N 105°02′51″W, el. 3,648 feet (1,112 m)
- Liscom Butte, 45°44′35″N 105°58′28″W, el. 4,344 feet (1,324 m)
- Little Pilgrim Butte, 45°29′40″N 105°11′13″W, el. 3,428 feet (1,045 m)
- Lonesome Peak, 45°16′37″N 105°30′48″W, el. 3,632 feet (1,107 m)
- Long Butte, 45°03′11″N 106°07′04″W, el. 4,160 feet (1,270 m)
- Mc Allister Butte, 45°26′58″N 105°41′53″W, el. 3,707 feet (1,130 m)
- Morellas Butte, 45°20′03″N 105°03′11″W, el. 3,668 feet (1,118 m)
- Mud Buttes, 45°35′27″N 105°00′13″W, el. 3,402 feet (1,037 m)
- Nipple Butte, 45°04′02″N 106°09′41″W, el. 4,065 feet (1,239 m)
- Oliphant Butte, 45°39′44″N 105°08′24″W, el. 3,235 feet (986 m)
- Phillips Butte, 45°16′04″N 105°58′35″W, el. 4,150 feet (1,260 m)
- Pine Butte, 45°23′54″N 105°00′27″W, el. 3,510 feet (1,070 m)
- Pine Hill, 45°36′54″N 105°05′59″W, el. 3,264 feet (995 m)
- Preston Buttes, 45°27′50″N 105°22′46″W, el. 3,241 feet (988 m)
- Rattlesnake Butte, 45°25′05″N 105°38′09″W, el. 3,707 feet (1,130 m)
- Rattlesnake Hill, 45°46′54″N 105°18′14″W, el. 3,409 feet (1,039 m)
- Reanus Cone, 45°11′37″N 106°06′36″W, el. 4,035 feet (1,230 m)
- Red Butte, 45°01′45″N 106°12′51″W, el. 4,242 feet (1,293 m)
- Red Hill, 45°37′55″N 105°03′41″W, el. 3,215 feet (980 m)
- Red Top Hill, 45°32′19″N 106°05′25″W, el. 3,609 feet (1,100 m)
- Rocky Butte, 45°10′39″N 105°20′16″W, el. 3,287 feet (1,002 m)
- Sand Creek Hill, 45°28′25″N 105°30′04″W, el. 3,501 feet (1,067 m)
- Sandefer Butte, 45°41′22″N 105°45′37″W, el. 3,474 feet (1,059 m)
- Shipley Butte, 45°28′48″N 105°04′51″W, el. 3,300 feet (1,000 m)
- Soldiers Mount, 45°45′02″N 105°05′09″W, el. 2,933 feet (894 m)
- Stag Rock, 45°19′16″N 106°09′28″W, el. 3,432 feet (1,046 m)
- Stag Rock Mountain, 45°19′08″N 106°11′07″W, el. 4,058 feet (1,237 m)
- Taylor Butte, 45°17′15″N 106°08′06″W, el. 3,989 feet (1,216 m)
- Tepee Hill, 45°41′58″N 105°13′09″W, el. 2,999 feet (914 m)
- Terrett Butte, 45°14′53″N 105°37′21″W, el. 3,530 feet (1,080 m)
- Threemile Buttes, 45°28′35″N 105°54′54″W, el. 4,255 feet (1,297 m)
- Twin Buttes, 45°42′43″N 105°35′10″W, el. 3,642 feet (1,110 m)
- Twin Buttes, 45°35′36″N 105°27′32″W, el. 3,205 feet (977 m)
- Two Tree Butte, 45°30′16″N 105°43′17″W, el. 3,776 feet (1,151 m)
- Wallop Butte, 45°05′34″N 106°05′38″W, el. 3,963 feet (1,208 m)
- Yager Butte, 45°27′35″N 106°01′29″W, el. 4,016 feet (1,224 m)
- Yarger Butte, 45°17′00″N 105°40′03″W, el. 3,930 feet (1,200 m)

== See also ==
- List of mountains in Montana
- List of mountain ranges in Montana
