= List of mountains in Silver Bow County, Montana =

There are at least 25 named mountains in Silver Bow County, Montana.

- Beals Hill, 45°58′09″N 112°52′33″W, el. 7,848 feet (2,392 m)
- Big Butte, 46°01′10″N 112°33′32″W, el. 6,299 feet (1,920 m)
- Big Rock, 45°48′00″N 112°56′46″W, el. 5,735 feet (1,748 m)
- Burnt Mountain, 45°56′01″N 112°49′42″W, el. 8,373 feet (2,552 m)
- Charcoal Mountain, 45°46′59″N 112°46′44″W, el. 6,653 feet (2,028 m)
- Coyote Hill, 45°48′11″N 112°27′39″W, el. 7,333 feet (2,235 m)
- Dickie Peak, 45°53′51″N 112°58′56″W, el. 9,104 feet (2,775 m)
- East Peak, 45°44′45″N 112°26′18″W, el. 9,898 feet (3,017 m)
- Feeley Hill, 45°52′59″N 112°39′38″W, el. 6,004 feet (1,830 m)
- Goat Mountain, 45°42′46″N 112°44′37″W, el. 6,503 feet (1,982 m)
- Gold Hill, 45°45′44″N 112°31′55″W, el. 7,690 feet (2,340 m)
- Granulated Mountain, 45°51′58″N 112°56′13″W, el. 9,150 feet (2,790 m)
- Grassy Granulated Mountain, 45°52′00″N 112°55′23″W, el. 8,592 feet (2,619 m)
- Hungry Hill, 45°54′31″N 112°53′29″W, el. 8,445 feet (2,574 m)
- King and Queen Hill, 45°42′05″N 112°34′14″W, el. 7,861 feet (2,396 m)
- Limekiln Hill, 45°48′55″N 112°27′34″W, el. 8,097 feet (2,468 m)
- Little Granulated Mountain, 45°52′15″N 112°57′11″W, el. 9,048 feet (2,758 m)
- Moffet Mountain, 45°43′02″N 112°35′13″W, el. 7,697 feet (2,346 m)
- Mount Fleecer, 45°49′35″N 112°48′09″W, el. 9,426 feet (2,873 m)
- Mount Humbug, 45°47′35″N 112°36′41″W, el. 8,218 feet (2,505 m)
- Negro Mountain, 45°43′48″N 112°36′34″W, el. 8,373 feet (2,552 m)
- Pandora Mountain, 45°42′44″N 112°34′35″W, el. 7,569 feet (2,307 m)
- Starlight Mountain, 45°54′31″N 112°50′06″W, el. 8,172 feet (2,491 m)
- Steep Mountain, 46°04′02″N 112°34′37″W, el. 6,739 feet (2,054 m)
- Timber Butte, 45°57′56″N 112°32′14″W, el. 6,306 feet (1,922 m)
- triton Plateau, 45°57′58″N 112°32′14″W, el. 6,306 feet (1,922 m)

== See also ==
- List of mountains in Montana
- List of mountain ranges in Montana
