= List of mountains in Broadwater County, Montana =

There are at least 27 named mountains in Broadwater County, Montana.

- Avalanche Butte, 46°45′22″N 111°29′11″W, el. 7,690 feet (2,340 m)
- Big Mountain, 46°16′17″N 111°43′28″W, el. 6,558 feet (1,999 m)
- Bilk Mountain, 46°39′51″N 111°27′59″W, el. 7,336 feet (2,236 m)
- Black Butte, 46°17′39″N 111°12′14″W, el. 6,604 feet (2,013 m)
- Black Butte, 46°27′53″N 111°22′38″W, el. 5,745 feet (1,751 m)
- Boulder Baldy, 46°33′22″N 111°19′37″W, el. 8,937 feet (2,724 m)
- Boulder Mountain, 46°32′39″N 111°21′03″W, el. 8,793 feet (2,680 m)
- Cayuse Mountain, 46°40′28″N 111°27′06″W, el. 7,064 feet (2,153 m)
- Cedar Hill, 46°05′38″N 111°24′21″W, el. 4,892 feet (1,491 m)
- Chewh-toowh-too-peh Hill, 46°03′59″N 111°33′57″W, el. 4,419 feet (1,347 m)
- Dutchie Butte, 46°26′21″N 111°21′48″W, el. 5,216 feet (1,590 m)
- Frenchman Hill, 46°11′43″N 111°45′30″W, el. 6,414 feet (1,955 m)
- Giant Hill, 46°18′24″N 111°41′15″W, el. 6,197 feet (1,889 m)
- Glendale Butte, 46°15′24″N 111°42′05″W, el. 5,974 feet (1,821 m)
- Grassy Mountain, 46°18′23″N 111°07′14″W, el. 7,690 feet (2,340 m)
- High Peak, 46°02′53″N 111°28′01″W, el. 5,607 feet (1,709 m)
- Hooligans Hill, 46°26′37″N 111°22′03″W, el. 4,859 feet (1,481 m)
- Lombard Hill, 46°06′24″N 111°23′47″W, el. 3,976 feet (1,212 m)
- Lone Mountain, 46°07′32″N 111°38′13″W, el. 4,997 feet (1,523 m)
- Mount Baldy, 46°26′25″N 111°14′51″W, el. 9,442 feet (2,878 m)
- Mount Edith, 46°25′54″N 111°11′07″W, el. 9,439 feet (2,877 m)
- Needham Mountain, 46°41′58″N 111°28′24″W, el. 6,742 feet (2,055 m)
- Pilot Knob, 46°25′27″N 111°20′13″W, el. 5,489 feet (1,673 m)
- Sherlock Mountain, 46°11′53″N 111°05′13″W, el. 6,604 feet (2,013 m)
- Sixmile Mountain, 46°11′41″N 111°13′28″W, el. 7,615 feet (2,321 m)
- The Buttes, 46°06′40″N 111°29′27″W, el. 4,324 feet (1,318 m)
- Wall Mountain, 46°13′02″N 111°03′47″W, el. 6,837 feet (2,084 m)

== See also ==
- List of mountains in Montana
- List of mountain ranges in Montana
