= List of mountains in Sheridan County, Montana =

There are at least 6 named mountains in Sheridan County, Montana.

- Brush Mountain, 48°28′26″N 104°05′02″W, el. 2,205 feet (672 m)
- Flagstaff Hill, 48°31′54″N 104°44′11″W, el. 2,523 feet (769 m)
- Kisler Butte, 48°43′08″N 104°44′09″W, el. 2,648 feet (807 m)
- Sand Butte, location unknown, el. 2,238 feet (682 m)
- Sand Hills, location unknown, el. 2,238 feet (682 m)
- Umbrights Hill, 48°29′49″N 104°23′35″W, el. 1,991 feet (607 m)

== See also ==
- List of mountains in Montana
