= List of mountains in Big Horn County, Montana =

There are at least 42 named mountains in Big Horn County, Montana.

- Abbots Urn, 45°41′57″N 107°25′08″W, el. 3,442 feet (1,049 m)
- Battle Ridge, 45°34′02″N 107°25′24″W, el. 3,284 feet (1,001 m)
- Black Gulch Point, 45°02′01″N 107°33′16″W, el. 4,902 feet (1,494 m)
- Buffalo Jump, 45°13′44″N 106°58′26″W, el. 4,518 feet (1,377 m)
- Buffalo Jump, 45°14′17″N 108°16′52″W, el. 4,606 feet (1,404 m)
- Busby Butte, 45°30′04″N 106°52′34″W, el. 4,544 feet (1,385 m)
- Calhoun Hill, 45°33′50″N 107°25′03″W, el. 3,304 feet (1,007 m)
- Castle Rock, 45°39′34″N 107°09′43″W, el. 3,839 feet (1,170 m)
- Chalk Butte, 45°11′55″N 107°18′49″W, el. 3,730 feet (1,140 m)
- Crown Butte, 45°15′20″N 108°30′41″W, el. 6,880 feet (2,100 m)
- Dead Indian Hill, 45°09′25″N 108°08′23″W, el. 4,557 feet (1,389 m)
- Eagle Butte, 45°41′18″N 107°17′59″W, el. 3,547 feet (1,081 m)
- Eagle Nest Peak, 45°12′43″N 106°59′56″W, el. 4,514 feet (1,376 m)
- Eagle Point, 45°02′14″N 107°36′53″W, el. 5,007 feet (1,526 m)
- Gracy Butte, 45°51′35″N 107°21′12″W, el. 3,379 feet (1,030 m)
- Grapevine Dome, 45°20′44″N 108°05′01″W, el. 4,485 feet (1,367 m)
- Half Moon Hill, 45°13′06″N 106°55′54″W, el. 4,511 feet (1,375 m)
- Hampton Butte, 45°00′58″N 106°24′20″W, el. 3,957 feet (1,206 m)
- Haystack Butte, 45°40′53″N 107°26′39″W, el. 3,202 feet (976 m)
- Haystack Butte, 45°47′28″N 107°23′12″W, el. 3,632 feet (1,107 m)
- Hellers Peak, 45°03′49″N 106°27′54″W, el. 3,717 feet (1,133 m)
- Hive Butte, 45°45′19″N 107°31′09″W, el. 3,100 feet (940 m)
- Horn Mountain, 45°18′31″N 106°53′10″W, el. 4,731 feet (1,442 m)
- Last Stand Hill, 45°34′13″N 107°25′37″W, el. 3,304 feet (1,007 m)
- Mission Buttes, 45°26′58″N 107°37′51″W, el. 3,921 feet (1,195 m)
- Old Flat Top, 45°05′42″N 106°29′47″W, el. 3,930 feet (1,200 m)
- Painted Hill, 45°36′44″N 106°50′40″W, el. 3,740 feet (1,140 m)
- Peyote Point, 45°07′53″N 107°55′24″W, el. 7,218 feet (2,200 m)
- Point Lookout, 45°06′53″N 107°53′08″W, el. 7,247 feet (2,209 m)
- Rattlesnake Butte, 45°16′31″N 107°40′08″W, el. 4,213 feet (1,284 m)
- Red Butte, 45°51′55″N 106°58′06″W, el. 4,459 feet (1,359 m)
- Red Hill, 45°37′13″N 106°56′23″W, el. 4,019 feet (1,225 m)
- Red Hills, 45°50′55″N 107°15′57″W, el. 3,468 feet (1,057 m)
- Sarpy Mountains, 45°38′45″N 106°59′04″W, el. 4,544 feet (1,385 m)
- Shortys Hill, 45°17′58″N 107°10′24″W, el. 5,121 feet (1,561 m)
- The Mesa, 45°00′42″N 107°42′12″W, el. 5,777 feet (1,761 m)
- The Pyramid, 45°04′52″N 106°19′21″W, el. 3,989 feet (1,216 m)
- Twin Peaks, 45°27′47″N 107°58′41″W, el. 3,524 feet (1,074 m)
- Walker Hill, 45°42′00″N 107°42′51″W, el. 3,261 feet (994 m)
- War Man Mountain, 45°15′03″N 107°53′47″W, el. 5,184 feet (1,580 m)
- Weir Point, 45°32′03″N 107°23′34″W, el. 3,415 feet (1,041 m)
- West Pryor Mountain, 45°19′15″N 108°36′44″W, el. 6,680 feet (2,040 m)

== See also ==
- List of mountains in Montana
- List of mountain ranges in Montana
