= List of mountains in Daniels County, Montana =

There are at least 11 named mountains in Daniels County, Montana.

- Dighans Hill, 48°48′41″N 105°51′46″W, el. 3,005 feet (916 m)
- Four Buttes, 48°49′37″N 105°38′02″W, el. 2,595 feet (791 m)
- Gregerson Hill, 48°51′11″N 105°53′27″W, el. 2,979 feet (908 m)
- Haugens Hill, 48°35′13″N 105°53′24″W, el. 2,949 feet (899 m)
- Jones Hill, 48°51′09″N 105°49′37″W, el. 2,884 feet (879 m)
- Long Butte, 48°57′03″N 105°13′27″W, el. 2,897 feet (883 m)
- Richland Hill, 48°49′22″N 106°00′06″W, el. 2,861 feet (872 m)
- Slaughter Hill, 48°51′58″N 105°51′17″W, el. 2,766 feet (843 m)
- Square Butte, 48°55′47″N 105°15′02″W, el. 2,897 feet (883 m)
- Sundby Hill, 48°47′40″N 105°51′25″W, el. 2,907 feet (886 m)
- Wild Horse Butte, 48°51′44″N 105°51′37″W, el. 2,894 feet (882 m)

== See also ==
- List of mountains in Montana
- List of mountain ranges in Montana
