= Gold Hill, Virginia =

Unincorporated community in Virginia, United States

Coordinates: 37°37′25″N 78°22′13″W

Gold Hill is an unincorporated community in Buckingham County, in the U.S. state of Virginia.
