= King and Queen Hill =

Mountain in the state of Montana

Coordinates: 45°42′05″N 112°34′14″W

King and Queen Hill is a summit in Silver Bow County, Montana, in the United States. With an elevation of 7,861 feet (2,396 m), King and Queen Hill is the 1006th highest summit in the state of Montana.
