= Boston Ravine, California =

Boston Ravine
- Former settlement
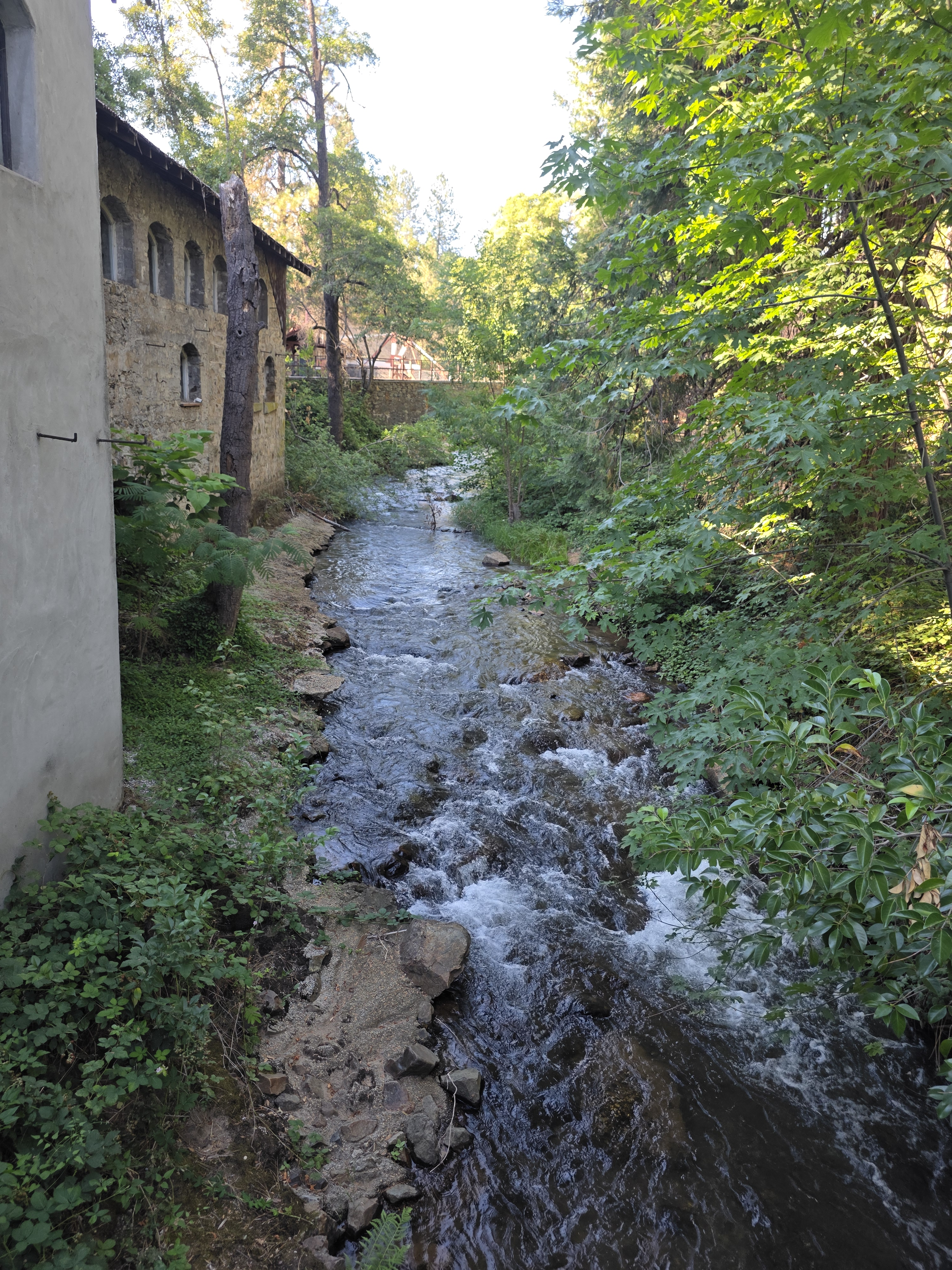
- Boston Ravine, Wolf Creek and the North Star Mine and Powerhouse

- Location in California
- Coordinates: 39°12′29″N 121°04′07″W
- Country: United States
- State: California
- County: Nevada County
- Elevation: 2,339 ft (713 m)

Boston Ravine is a former settlement and a geographic feature in Nevada County, California. Boston Ravine is located 1 mile (1.6 km) south-southwest of Grass Valley. Its elevation is 2,339 ft (713 m) above sea level. The ravine was formed by Wolf Creek, which flows through it.

== History ==
The settlement began in the fall of 1849 with four cabins on the south of a ravine, erected by the Boston Company, led by Rev. H.H. Cummings. By 1853, there were several quartz mills, and later a foundry. It is situated .5 mi (0.80 km) from present-day Grass Valley, California.

A post office operated at Boston Ravine from 1889 to 1890. It is the current location of the North Star Mine Powerhouse and Pelton Wheel Museum.

== Climate ==
According to the Köppen Climate Classification system, Boston Ravine has a warm-summer Mediterranean climate, abbreviated "Csa" on climate maps.
