= List of mountains in Rosebud County, Montana =

There are at least 32 named mountains in Rosebud County, Montana.

- Badger Peak, 45°38′33″N 106°32′52″W, el. 4,403 feet (1,342 m)
- Battle Butte, 45°17′02″N 106°34′56″W, el. 3,343 feet (1,019 m)
- Black Buttes, 46°25′25″N 106°27′17″W, el. 2,999 feet (914 m)
- Blacktail Butte, 46°47′40″N 106°58′15″W, el. 3,419 feet (1,042 m)
- Browns Mountain, 45°22′03″N 106°27′06″W, el. 4,032 feet (1,229 m)
- Castle Butte, 46°22′33″N 106°48′11″W, el. 3,077 feet (938 m)
- Castle Rock, location unknown, el. 3,113 feet (949 m)
- Chalky Point, 45°43′29″N 106°54′33″W, el. 4,445 feet (1,355 m)
- Charlie Black Butte, 45°40′50″N 106°33′05″W, el. 4,295 feet (1,309 m)
- Cook Creek Butte, 45°26′02″N 106°43′42″W, el. 4,488 feet (1,368 m)
- Eagle Rock, 46°32′29″N 107°40′38″W, el. 3,638 feet (1,109 m)
- Eagle Rock, 45°55′43″N 106°35′14″W, el. 3,346 feet (1,020 m)
- Fisher Butte, 45°33′12″N 106°30′47″W, el. 4,396 feet (1,340 m)
- Garfield Peak, 45°41′04″N 106°26′08″W, el. 4,134 feet (1,260 m)
- Gobblers Knob, 45°56′29″N 106°18′15″W, el. 3,291 feet (1,003 m)
- Gold Butte, 46°40′48″N 106°55′03″W, el. 2,976 feet (907 m)
- Horse Creek Buttes, 45°16′08″N 106°17′24″W, el. 4,134 feet (1,260 m)
- Ice Cream Butte, 46°24′33″N 106°31′42″W, el. 2,844 feet (867 m)
- Jack Creek Hill, 46°19′07″N 106°21′54″W, el. 2,618 feet (798 m)
- King Mountain, 45°28′32″N 106°14′19″W, el. 4,160 feet (1,270 m)
- Poker Jim Butte, 45°19′28″N 106°21′56″W, el. 4,350 feet (1,330 m)
- Pyramid Butte, 45°17′11″N 106°31′07″W, el. 3,917 feet (1,194 m)
- Rattlesnake Buttes, 46°45′02″N 107°44′37″W, el. 3,156 feet (962 m)
- Rosebud Buttes, 46°10′26″N 106°23′51″W, el. 3,307 feet (1,008 m)
- Round Butte, 46°47′52″N 106°39′25″W, el. 3,008 feet (917 m)
- Sand Buttes, 46°26′29″N 106°18′26″W, el. 2,894 feet (882 m)
- Schoolmarm Buttes, 46°23′28″N 106°37′52″W, el. 2,812 feet (857 m)
- Sunday Butte, 46°45′04″N 106°35′40″W, el. 3,156 feet (962 m)
- The Big Hill, 46°49′05″N 106°39′35″W, el. 3,189 feet (972 m)
- Trembling Butte, 45°49′54″N 106°15′12″W, el. 3,225 feet (983 m)
- Twin Tops, 46°31′57″N 107°45′54″W, el. 3,537 feet (1,078 m)
- Wild Hog Butte, 45°15′49″N 106°20′53″W, el. 4,114 feet (1,254 m)

== See also ==
- List of mountains in Montana
- List of mountain ranges in Montana
