= Gold Hill, Placer County, California =

Unincorporated community in California, United States

Gold Hill
- Unincorporated community
- Location in California Gold Hill (the United States)
- Coordinates: 38°54′06″N 121°10′54″W
- Country: United States
- State: California
- County: Placer County
- Elevation: 354 ft (108 m)

Gold Hill (formerly, Orr City) is an unincorporated community in Placer County, California. Gold Hill is located 6 miles (9.7 km) west of Auburn. It lies at an elevation of 354 feet (108 m).

Gold Hill is located within the Sierra Nevada foothills, in a geologic region known as the West Belt, so named because it is west of the Mother Lode Belt. This West Belt contained scattered deposits of gold in quartz veins within the granitic bedrock. In 1851, after gold was discovered in Ophir and Auburn, Georgian prospectors followed the Auburn Ravine, looking for similar placer gold. They found gold in the ravine near an elevated area they named Gold Hill. In addition to the gravel deposits, the hill itself was developed by two companies, known as the Georgia and the Ohio, using ground sluicing from water in the ravine. The town's civil government was organized in the spring of 1852, with the election of a Justice of the Peace, and a Constable. The population of the mining community peaked in 1856.
