= List of mountains in Fergus County, Montana =

There are at least 60 named mountains in Fergus County, Montana.

- Bald Butte, 47°12′48″N 109°18′04″W, el. 5,111 feet (1,558 m)
- Bald Butte, 46°47′29″N 108°58′57″W, el. 5,607 feet (1,709 m)
- Bald Butte, 46°54′51″N 108°38′25″W, el. 4,055 feet (1,236 m)
- Bald Butte, 47°36′57″N 109°10′23″W, el. 3,478 feet (1,060 m)
- Big Grassy Peak, 47°12′14″N 109°13′04″W, el. 5,899 feet (1,798 m)
- Black Butte, 47°14′08″N 108°58′13″W, el. 5,535 feet (1,687 m)
- Black Butte, 47°28′40″N 109°45′00″W, el. 3,487 feet (1,063 m)
- Bloomfield Butte, 47°33′18″N 109°15′43″W, el. 3,435 feet (1,047 m)
- Burnette Peak, 47°09′03″N 109°21′13″W, el. 5,830 feet (1,780 m)
- Button Butte, 47°30′13″N 108°30′21″W, el. 2,966 feet (904 m)
- Button Butte, 46°57′25″N 108°42′55″W, el. 4,501 feet (1,372 m)
- Castle Butte, 46°58′22″N 109°24′06″W, el. 4,947 feet (1,508 m)
- Cherry Top, 47°37′52″N 109°47′12″W, el. 3,514 feet (1,071 m)
- Clagget Hill, 47°43′06″N 109°37′56″W, el. 2,648 feet (807 m)
- Coal Hill, 47°22′22″N 108°47′18″W, el. 3,465 feet (1,056 m)
- Collar Peak, 47°12′07″N 109°11′41″W, el. 5,964 feet (1,818 m)
- Cone Butte, 47°15′31″N 109°04′19″W, el. 5,807 feet (1,770 m)
- Crystal Peak, 47°11′09″N 109°11′40″W, el. 5,942 feet (1,811 m)
- Elk Peak, 47°13′36″N 109°08′40″W, el. 5,919 feet (1,804 m)
- Flat Mountain, 47°05′23″N 109°14′09″W, el. 5,479 feet (1,670 m)
- Gold Hill, 47°10′42″N 109°12′55″W, el. 5,410 feet (1,650 m)
- Greathouse Peak, 46°46′07″N 109°21′21″W, el. 8,658 feet (2,639 m)
- Haystack Butte, 47°21′52″N 108°30′10″W, el. 3,369 feet (1,027 m)
- Indian Butte, 47°33′43″N 108°45′22″W, el. 3,045 feet (928 m)
- Indian Graves Butte, 47°16′14″N 109°37′50″W, el. 3,904 feet (1,190 m)
- Judith Peak, 47°13′00″N 109°13′19″W, el. 6,293 feet (1,918 m)
- Jump Off Peak, 46°48′21″N 109°27′00″W, el. 7,510 feet (2,290 m)
- Kelly Hill, 47°05′52″N 109°16′20″W, el. 5,351 feet (1,631 m)
- Lewis Peak, 47°13′56″N 109°07′04″W, el. 5,600 feet (1,700 m)
- Lime Cave Peak, 46°49′15″N 109°26′21″W, el. 7,018 feet (2,139 m)
- Lookout Peak, 47°14′43″N 109°02′05″W, el. 5,312 feet (1,619 m)
- Lyons Butte, 46°53′50″N 109°07′50″W, el. 5,469 feet (1,667 m)
- Maginnis Mountain, 47°12′54″N 109°10′18″W, el. 5,810 feet (1,770 m)
- Maiden Peak, 47°11′23″N 109°13′37″W, el. 5,620 feet (1,710 m)
- McDonald Butte, 46°59′11″N 109°01′05″W, el. 4,288 feet (1,307 m)
- Mount Harlow, 46°47′47″N 109°29′42″W, el. 7,106 feet (2,166 m)
- New Year Peak, 47°09′20″N 109°20′22″W, el. 5,879 feet (1,792 m)
- Oil Well Hill, 47°38′16″N 109°28′28″W, el. 3,337 feet (1,017 m)
- Old Baldy, 46°45′08″N 109°18′50″W, el. 8,671 feet (2,643 m)
- Peck Hills, 47°32′36″N 109°04′20″W, el. 3,120 feet (950 m)
- Pekay Peak, 47°09′44″N 109°13′40″W, el. 5,997 feet (1,828 m)
- Porphyry Peak, 47°12′48″N 109°15′56″W, el. 5,997 feet (1,828 m)
- Pyramid Peak, 47°08′37″N 109°17′53″W, el. 6,033 feet (1,839 m)
- Rattlesnake Butte, 47°16′21″N 108°58′14″W, el. 3,953 feet (1,205 m)
- Red Mountain, 47°13′31″N 109°11′30″W, el. 6,122 feet (1,866 m)
- Reed Hill, 47°40′46″N 109°38′03″W, el. 2,825 feet (861 m)
- Reppe Butte, 47°43′45″N 109°00′35″W, el. 3,228 feet (984 m)
- Rocky Butte, 47°11′00″N 109°29′34″W, el. 4,842 feet (1,476 m)
- Sand Rock Hill, 47°17′34″N 109°39′20″W, el. 3,730 feet (1,140 m)
- Seventynine Hill, 47°38′01″N 109°37′44″W, el. 2,769 feet (844 m)
- Seventytwo Hills, 47°19′33″N 109°36′08″W, el. 3,835 feet (1,169 m)
- Sheep Mountain, 47°10′02″N 109°12′53″W, el. 5,840 feet (1,780 m)
- Sheepherder Peak, 47°22′55″N 109°17′36″W, el. 3,953 feet (1,205 m)
- Smoky Johnson Hill, 47°34′47″N 108°30′14″W, el. 2,766 feet (843 m)
- The Peak, 47°38′05″N 109°44′02″W, el. 3,353 feet (1,022 m)
- Three Buttes, 46°54′05″N 108°39′38″W, el. 4,114 feet (1,254 m)
- Twin Buttes, 47°25′23″N 109°41′20″W, el. 3,599 feet (1,097 m)
- West Peak, 46°46′47″N 109°32′11″W, el. 8,186 feet (2,495 m)
- White Horse Butte, 47°41′53″N 109°09′21″W, el. 3,255 feet (992 m)
- Woodhawk Hill, 47°42′51″N 109°12′32″W, el. 3,524 feet (1,074 m)

== See also ==
- List of mountains in Montana
- List of mountain ranges in Montana
