= Castle Butte (Valley of the Gods) =

5700ft (1737m) elevation summit in San Juan County, Utah

- Eagle Plume Tower
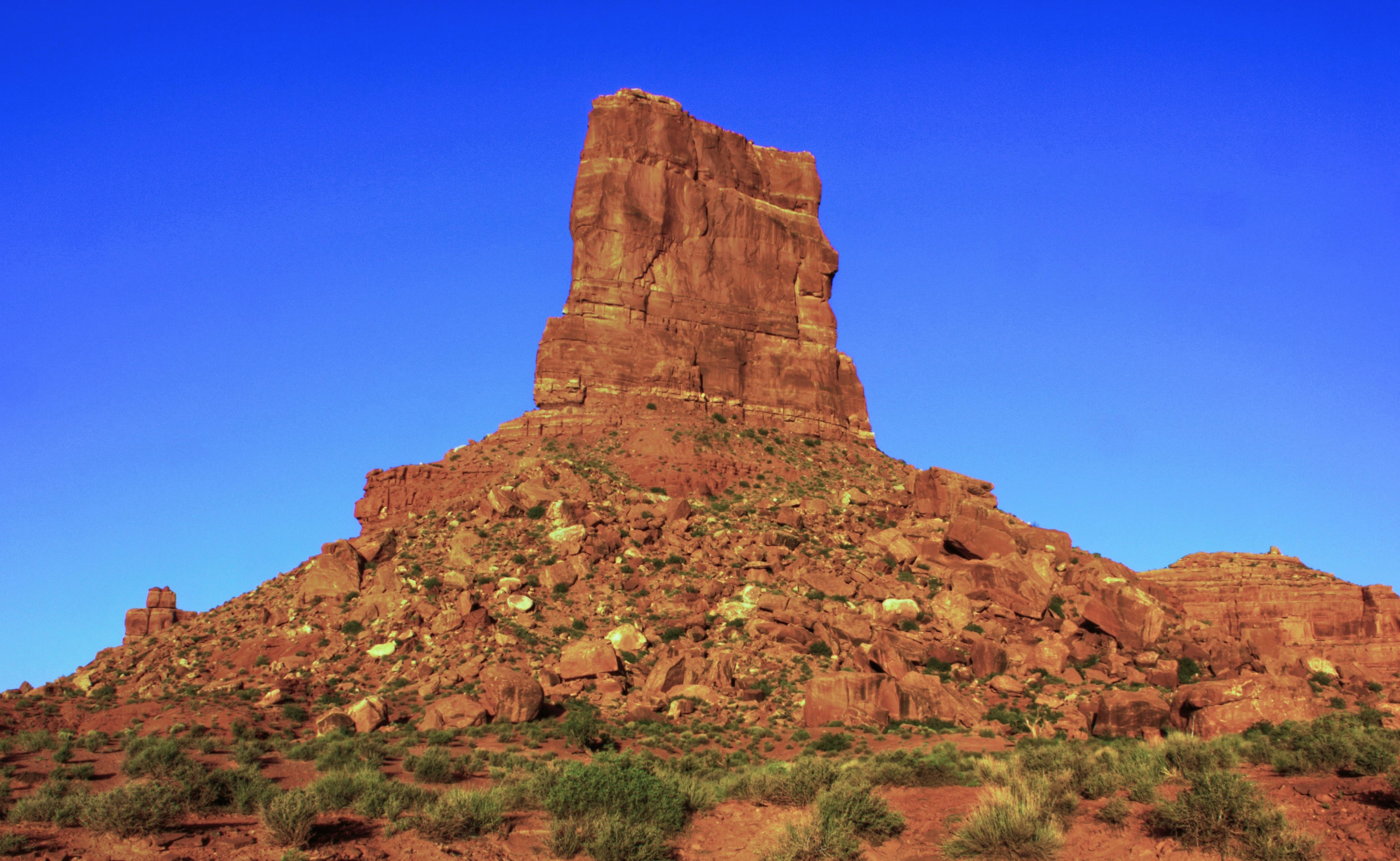
- North aspect

Highest point
- Elevation: 5,700 ft (1,737 m)
- Prominence: 560 ft (171 m)
- Parent peak: Bears Ears
- Isolation: 2.34 mi (3.77 km)
- Coordinates: 37°18′52″N 109°51′15″W

Geography
- Location within Utah Location within the United States
- Location: Valley of the Gods; San Juan County, Utah, U.S.
- Parent range: Colorado Plateau
- Topo map: USGS Cigarette Spring Cave

Geology
- Rock age: Permian
- Mountain type: Butte
- Rock type: Sandstone

Climbing
- First ascent: 1976
- Easiest route: class 5.10b climbing

Castle Butte is a 5,700-foot-elevation (1,737-meter) summit in San Juan County, Utah, United States.

== Description ==
Castle Butte is situated 16 miles (26 km) west of Bluff, Utah, in the Valley of the Gods, on land administered by the Bureau of Land Management. Precipitation runoff from this iconic landform's slopes drains to the San Juan River via Lime Creek. Access to the butte is via the 17-mile Valley of the Gods Road which makes a change of direction loop around this butte. Topographic relief is significant as the summit rises 600 feet (183 meters) above the surrounding terrain in 0.15 mile (0.24 km). This landform's toponym has been officially adopted as Castle Butte by the United States Board on Geographic Names, however it is also known as Eagle Plume Tower. The first ascent of the summit was made in 1976 by Bill Forrest and Frank Luptom via the South Face.

== Geology ==
Castle Butte is composed of two principal strata of the Cutler Formation. The bottom layer is slope-forming Halgaito Formation and the upper stratum is cliff-forming Cedar Mesa Sandstone. Cedar Mesa Sandstone is the remains of coastal sand dunes deposited about 270 to 300 million years ago, during the Wolfcampian (early Permian). The buttes of Valley of the Gods are the result of the Halgaito Formation being more easily eroded than the overlaying sandstone. The valley floor is Honaker Trail Formation.

== Climate ==
Spring and fall are the most favorable seasons to visit Castle Butte. According to the Köppen climate classification system, it is located in a cold semi-arid climate zone with cold winters and hot summers. Summers highs rarely exceed 100 °F (38 °C). Summer nights are comfortably cool, and temperatures drop quickly after sunset. Winters are cold, but daytime highs are usually above freezing. Winter temperatures below 0 °F (−18 °C) are uncommon, though possible. This desert climate receives less than 10 inches (250 millimeters) of annual rainfall, and snowfall is generally light during the winter.

== Gallery ==
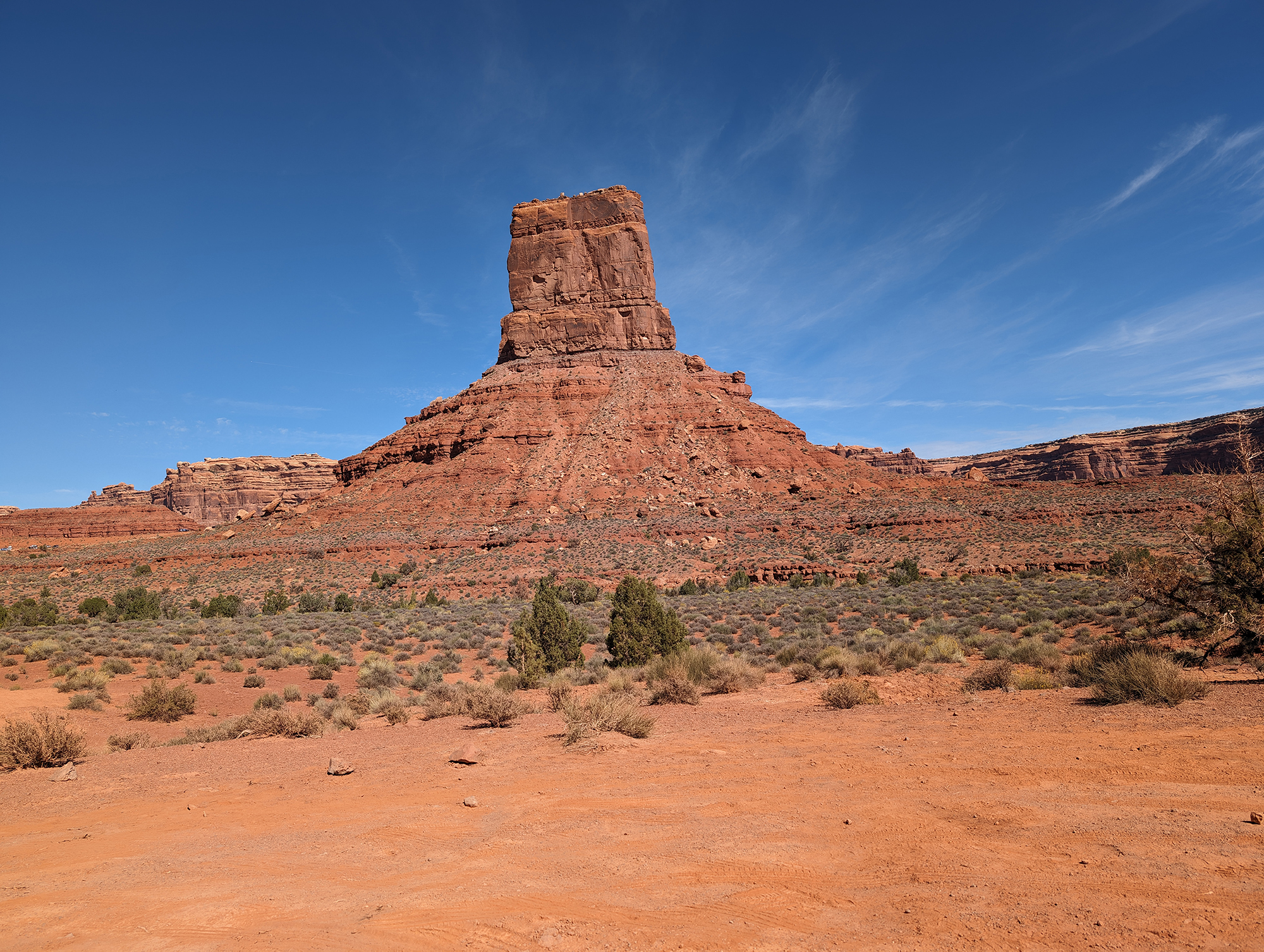
Southwest aspect

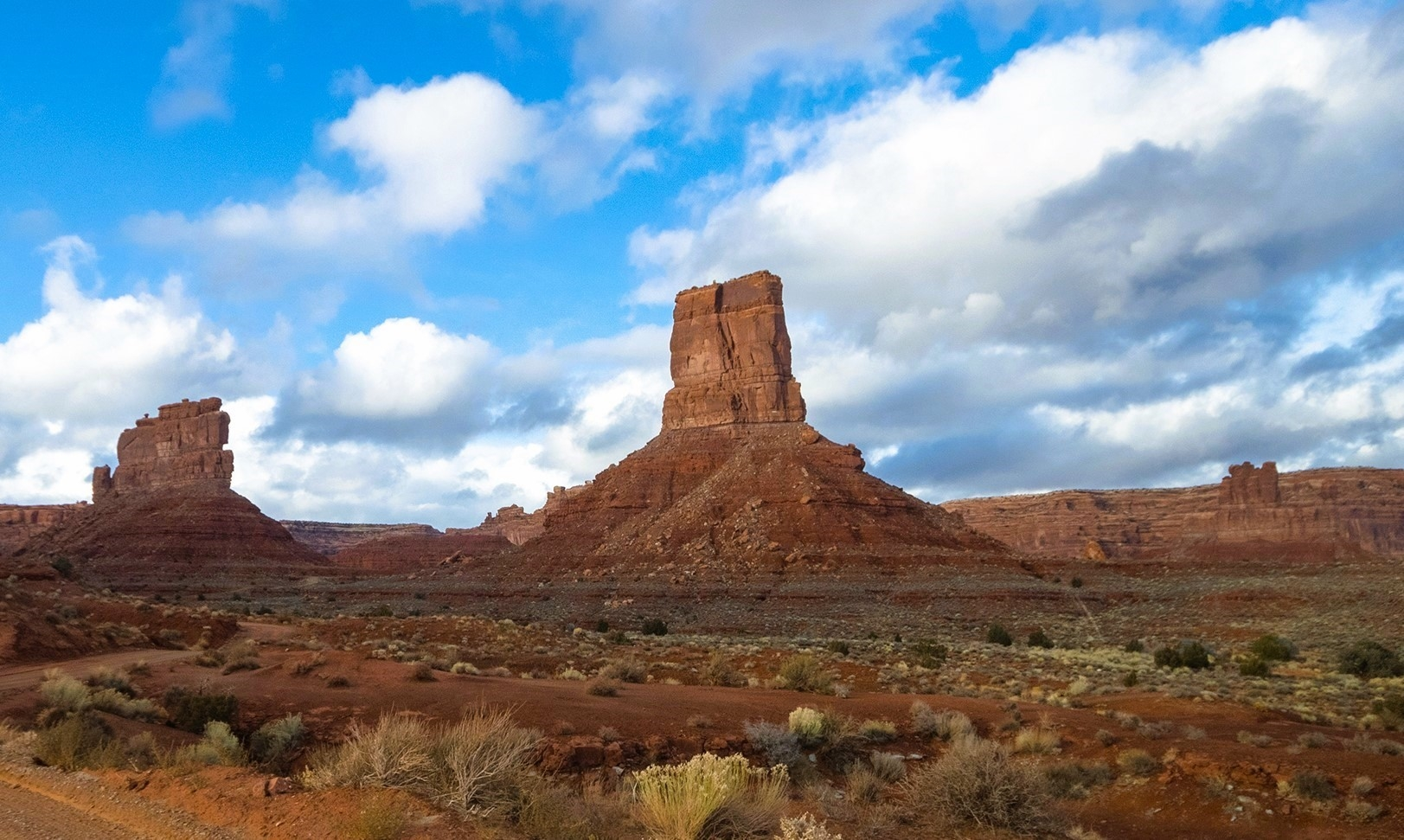
South aspect, centered

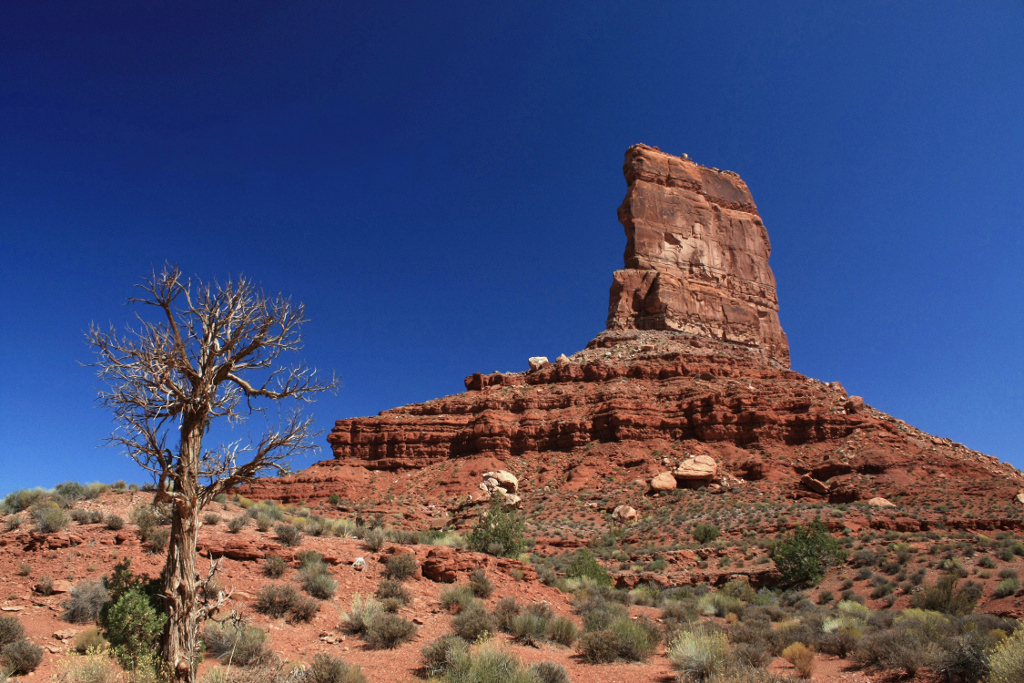
West aspect

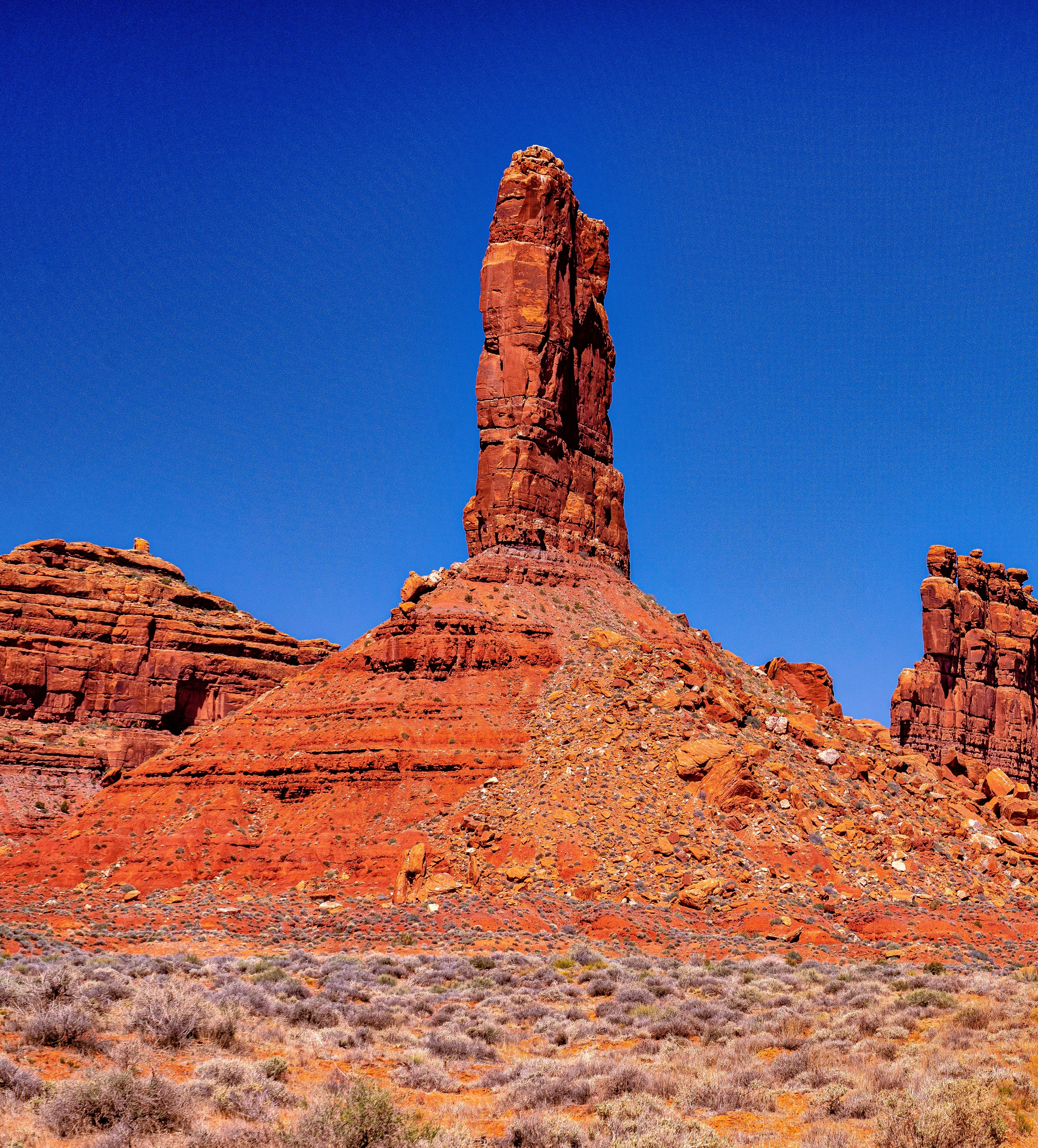
East aspect

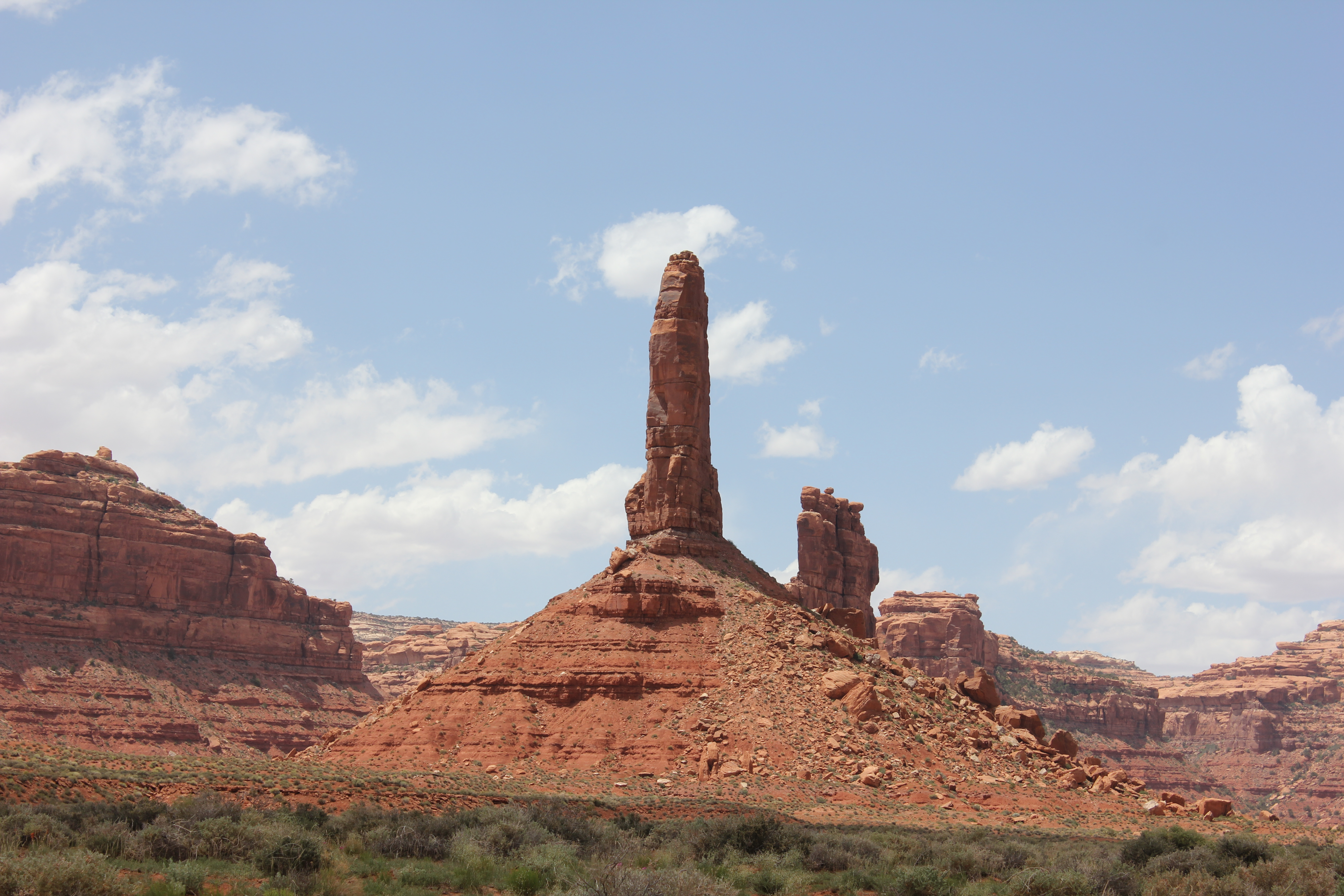
East aspect

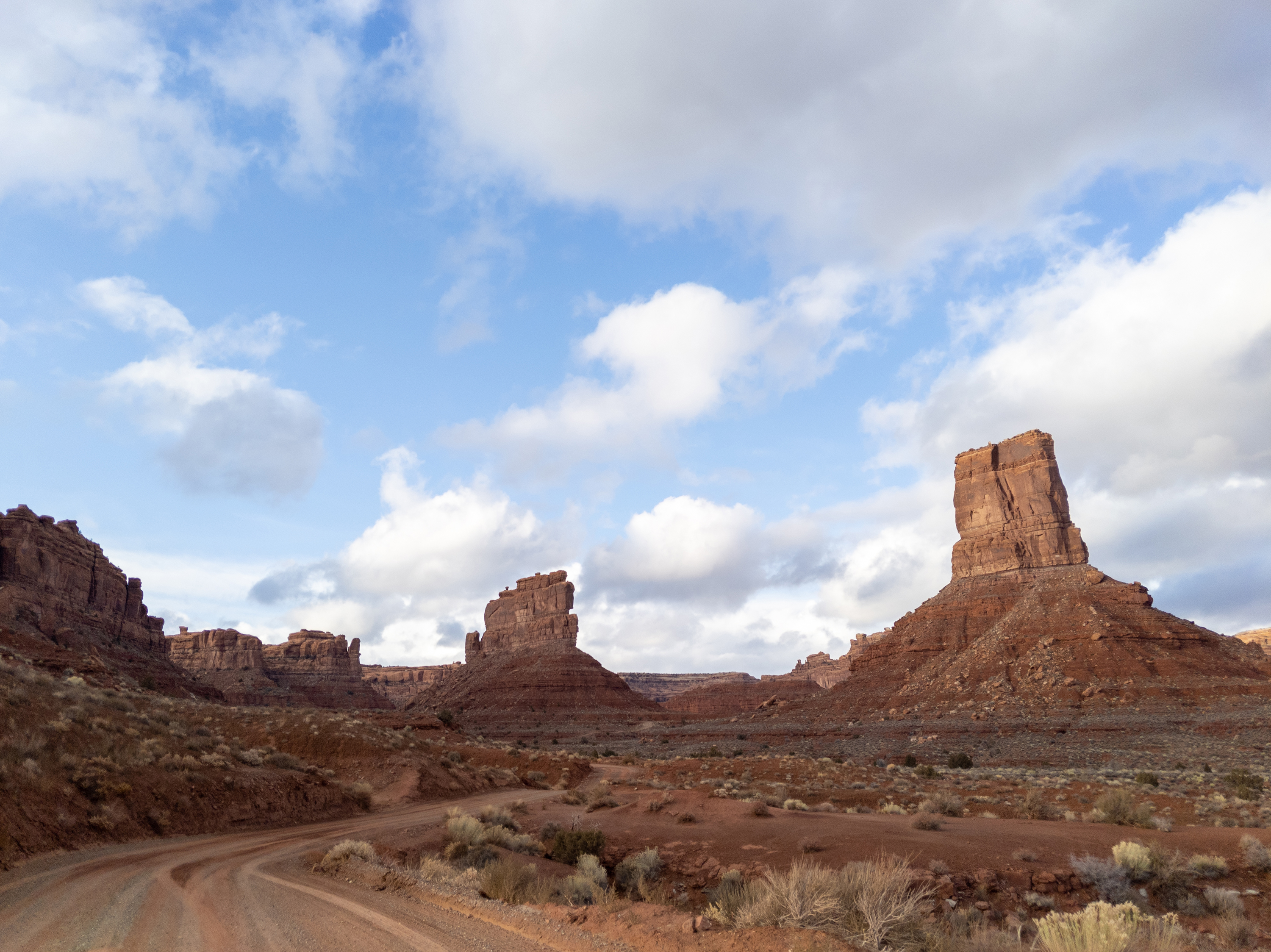
Castle Butte to the right

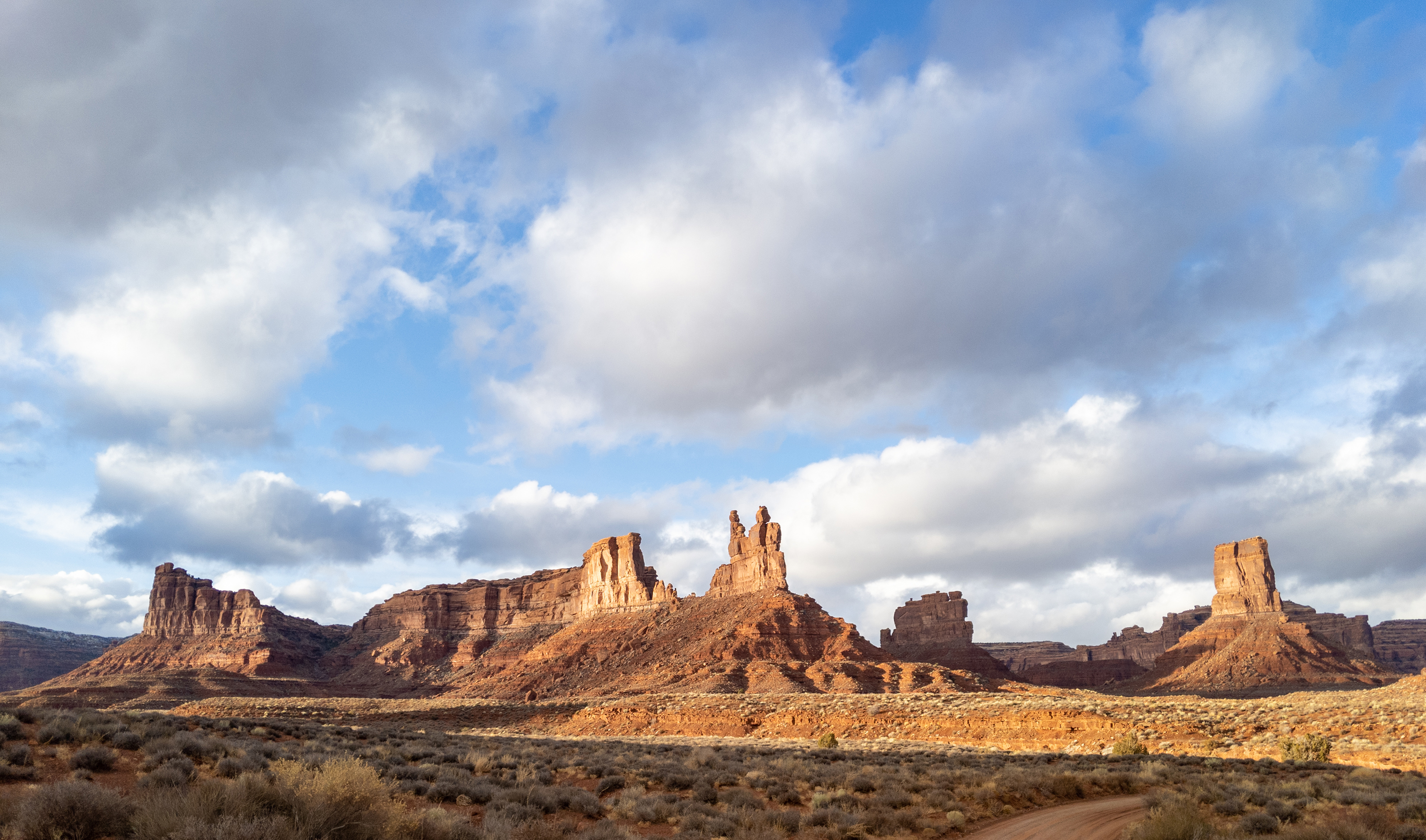
Castle Butte to the right

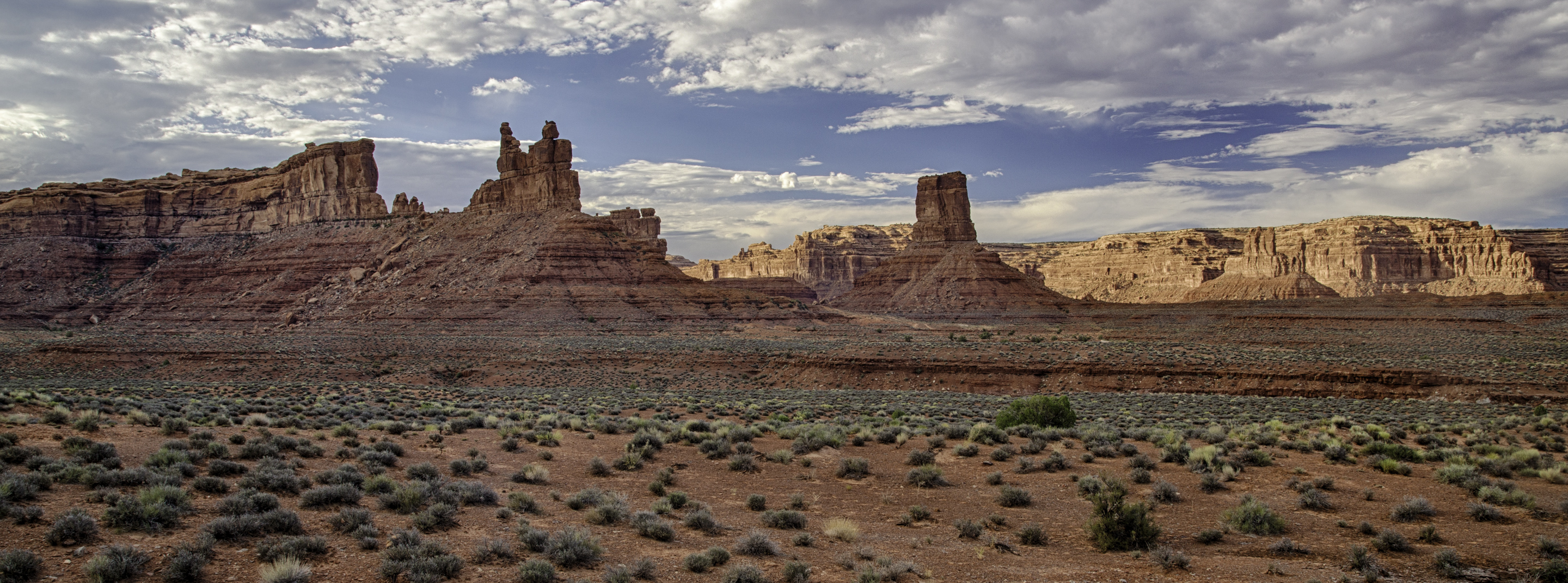
Castle Butte to right of center

== See also ==
- Castle Rock (San Juan County, Utah)
