= List of mountains in Phillips County, Montana =

There are at least 39 named mountains in Phillips County, Montana.

- Antoine Butte, 47°55′55″N 108°34′41″W, el. 5,722 feet (1,744 m)
- Barnard Buttes, 47°45′57″N 107°35′05″W, el. 2,966 feet (904 m)
- Bear Mountain, 47°56′05″N 108°28′17″W, el. 4,777 feet (1,456 m)
- Beaver Mountain, 47°57′43″N 108°31′48″W, el. 5,541 feet (1,689 m)
- Brandon Butte, 47°36′26″N 107°44′48″W, el. 2,936 feet (895 m)
- Button Butte, 48°05′12″N 107°53′27″W, el. 2,477 feet (755 m)
- Coal Mine Hill, 47°50′27″N 107°31′55″W, el. 3,346 feet (1,020 m)
- Coburn Butte, 47°53′23″N 108°21′52″W, el. 3,786 feet (1,154 m)
- Collins Hill, 47°53′00″N 107°31′55″W, el. 2,979 feet (908 m)
- Coming Day Butte, 47°58′43″N 108°29′27″W, el. 4,984 feet (1,519 m)
- Damon Hill, 47°55′52″N 108°37′22″W, el. 4,682 feet (1,427 m)
- Double S Hill, 48°34′08″N 107°17′57″W, el. 2,326 feet (709 m)
- Fanny Hill, 48°33′44″N 107°46′42″W, el. 2,608 feet (795 m)
- Fortress Butte, 47°43′10″N 108°49′26″W, el. 2,648 feet (807 m)
- Gold Bug Butte, 47°54′55″N 108°36′43″W, el. 5,446 feet (1,660 m)
- Green Mountain, 47°57′22″N 108°33′11″W, el. 5,492 feet (1,674 m)
- Haystack Butte, 48°44′31″N 108°08′52″W, el. 2,913 feet (888 m)
- Hubert Hill, 48°41′58″N 108°05′32″W, el. 2,743 feet (836 m)
- Indian Peak, 47°54′30″N 108°38′55″W, el. 5,075 feet (1,547 m)
- Larb Hills, 47°49′21″N 107°30′45″W, el. 3,218 feet (981 m)
- Mickey Butte, 47°35′28″N 107°46′21″W, el. 2,884 feet (879 m)
- Mission Peak, 47°55′13″N 108°37′30″W, el. 5,525 feet (1,684 m)
- Old Scraggy Peak, 47°56′19″N 108°31′41″W, el. 5,666 feet (1,727 m)
- Reynolds Hill, 47°41′01″N 107°39′55″W, el. 2,487 feet (758 m)
- Ricker Butte, 47°53′09″N 108°23′22″W, el. 3,966 feet (1,209 m)
- Saddle Butte, 47°53′34″N 108°32′21″W, el. 5,174 feet (1,577 m)
- Saskatchewan Butte, 47°51′44″N 108°50′02″W, el. 3,405 feet (1,038 m)
- Schuyler Butte, 47°40′34″N 107°37′00″W, el. 2,858 feet (871 m)
- Sharette Butte, 47°52′50″N 108°26′48″W, el. 4,052 feet (1,235 m)
- Shell Butte, 47°56′23″N 108°33′08″W, el. 5,689 feet (1,734 m)
- Silver Peak, 47°53′17″N 108°35′00″W, el. 5,459 feet (1,664 m)
- Spring Park Butte, 47°55′27″N 108°29′11″W, el. 4,416 feet (1,346 m)
- Square Butte, 47°46′21″N 107°35′41″W, el. 2,933 feet (894 m)
- Sugar Loaf Butte, 47°53′34″N 108°36′47″W, el. 4,892 feet (1,491 m)
- Tea Kettle Butte, 48°46′09″N 107°34′26″W, el. 2,671 feet (814 m)
- Thornhill Butte, 47°51′25″N 108°40′49″W, el. 4,616 feet (1,407 m)
- Travois Butte, 47°58′35″N 108°26′15″W, el. 4,678 feet (1,426 m)
- Turkey Track Hill, 48°33′17″N 107°21′22″W, el. 2,323 feet (708 m)
- Whitcomb Butte, 47°54′43″N 108°31′32″W, el. 4,472 feet (1,363 m)

== See also ==
- List of mountains in Montana
- List of mountain ranges in Montana
