= Pine Hill Airport =

Pine Hill Airport may refer to the following airports in thec United States:

- Pine Hill Airport (New York)
- Pine Hill Airport (Massachusetts)
- Pine Hill Municipal Airport, Wilcox County, Alabama
