= List of mountains in Carter County, Montana =

There are at least 40 named mountains in Carter County, Montana.

- Belcher Mountain, 45°07′51″N 104°57′32″W, el. 4,009 feet (1,222 m)
- Belltower Butte, 45°36′00″N 104°17′26″W, el. 3,921 feet (1,195 m)
- Big Hill, 45°49′47″N 104°43′21″W, el. 3,947 feet (1,203 m)
- Black Point, 45°10′00″N 104°37′54″W, el. 3,750 feet (1,140 m)
- Blue Mud Hills, 45°37′36″N 104°41′58″W, el. 3,501 feet (1,067 m)
- Capitol Rock, 45°35′43″N 104°07′12″W, el. 4,042 feet (1,232 m)
- Chimney Rock, 45°58′19″N 104°24′47″W, el. 3,547 feet (1,081 m)
- Coal Creek Hill, 45°52′33″N 104°13′01″W, el. 3,209 feet (978 m)
- Coal Creek Hill, 45°52′23″N 104°12′56″W, el. 3,222 feet (982 m)
- Dead Horse Point, 45°16′11″N 104°37′44″W, el. 3,881 feet (1,183 m)
- Dutchmans Hill, 45°56′17″N 104°20′07″W, el. 3,540 feet (1,080 m)
- Finger Buttes, 45°19′36″N 104°23′33″W, el. 4,196 feet (1,279 m)
- Flasted Hill, 45°57′49″N 104°14′40″W, el. 3,442 feet (1,049 m)
- Grassy Butte, 45°43′15″N 104°08′07″W, el. 3,494 feet (1,065 m)
- Greasy Hill, 45°13′47″N 104°48′11″W, el. 4,068 feet (1,240 m)
- Hackett Butte, 45°34′14″N 104°58′31″W, el. 3,360 feet (1,020 m)
- Haystack Butte, 45°29′59″N 104°57′27″W, el. 3,297 feet (1,005 m)
- Indian Butte, 45°25′39″N 104°05′20″W, el. 3,333 feet (1,016 m)
- Mud Butte, 45°28′04″N 104°04′28″W, el. 3,297 feet (1,005 m)
- Newberry Knob, 45°47′29″N 104°40′33″W, el. 3,750 feet (1,140 m)
- Pine Hill, 45°40′44″N 104°58′15″W, el. 3,392 feet (1,034 m)
- Piney Butte, 46°01′31″N 104°30′54″W, el. 3,432 feet (1,046 m)
- Pocochichee Butte, 45°30′55″N 104°56′57″W, el. 3,297 feet (1,005 m)
- Potato Buttes, 45°18′58″N 104°30′35″W, el. 3,773 feet (1,150 m)
- Potato Buttes, 45°20′51″N 104°31′15″W, el. 3,599 feet (1,097 m)
- Red Hill, 45°54′34″N 104°27′10″W, el. 3,599 feet (1,097 m)
- Roosevelt Rock, 46°02′40″N 104°28′17″W, el. 3,428 feet (1,045 m)
- Saddle Butte, 45°30′19″N 104°58′00″W, el. 3,281 feet (1,000 m)
- Saddle Butte, 45°37′54″N 104°48′16″W, el. 3,720 feet (1,130 m)
- Sheep Mountain, 45°28′56″N 104°11′38″W, el. 3,927 feet (1,197 m)
- Stone Lady Rock, 46°01′07″N 104°29′14″W, el. 3,425 feet (1,044 m)
- Stormy Butte, 45°37′47″N 104°08′31″W, el. 3,911 feet (1,192 m)
- Three Peaks, 45°24′44″N 104°05′28″W, el. 3,346 feet (1,020 m)
- Timber Hill, 45°33′25″N 104°10′37″W, el. 3,543 feet (1,080 m)
- Tip Top Butte, 45°17′52″N 104°42′06″W, el. 3,894 feet (1,187 m)
- Twin Buttes, 45°19′30″N 104°40′17″W, el. 3,776 feet (1,151 m)
- W L Butte, 45°36′09″N 104°49′24″W, el. 3,399 feet (1,036 m)
- West Butte, 45°05′27″N 105°01′17″W, el. 4,413 feet (1,345 m)
- Wilder Butte, 45°57′56″N 104°34′42″W, el. 3,566 feet (1,087 m)
- Wolf Point, 45°15′31″N 104°42′52″W, el. 3,934 feet (1,199 m)

== See also ==
- List of mountains in Montana
- List of mountain ranges in Montana
