= List of mountains in Wibaux County, Montana =

There are at least 11 named mountains in Wibaux County, Montana.

- Baird Butte, 48°53′54″N 104°11′15″W, el. 2,946 feet (898 m)
- Beehive, 47°18′34″N 104°13′18″W, el. 2,451 feet (747 m)
- Blue Mountain, 47°15′34″N 104°10′06″W, el. 2,881 feet (878 m)
- Four Buttes, 47°06′08″N 104°12′00″W, el. 2,802 feet (854 m)
- Graveyard Hill, 48°46′18″N 104°31′31″W, el. 2,697 feet (822 m)
- Horse Point, 48°50′14″N 104°12′34″W, el. 2,904 feet (885 m)
- Jackrabbit Butte, 48°51′35″N 104°09′22″W, el. 2,946 feet (898 m)
- Mount McKinley, 48°49′14″N 104°31′58″W, el. 2,674 feet (815 m)
- Pine Hill, 48°46′36″N 104°35′18″W, el. 2,828 feet (862 m)
- Podolski Butte, 48°46′56″N 104°09′25″W, el. 3,068 feet (935 m)
- Red Top Butte, 48°51′09″N 104°09′39″W, el. 3,074 feet (937 m)

== See also ==
- List of mountains in Montana
