= Castle Butte, Arizona =

Populated place in Navajo County, Arizona

- Populated place
- Location within the state of Arizona Castle Butte, Arizona (the United States)
- Coordinates: 35°18′17″N 110°20′55″W
- Country: United States
- State: Arizona
- County: Navajo
- Elevation: 5,807 ft (1,770 m)
- Time zone: UTC-7 (Mountain (MST))
  - Summer (DST): UTC-7 (MST)
- Area code: 928
- FIPS code: 04-10880
- GNIS feature ID: 24346

Castle Butte is a populated place situated in Navajo County, Arizona, United States.

== History ==
Castle Butte's population was 15 in the 1960 census.
