= List of mountains in Deer Lodge County, Montana =

There are at least 34 named mountains in Deer Lodge County, Montana.

- Bear Mountain, 45°54′38″N 113°00′30″W, el. 8,648 feet (2,636 m)
- Beaverhead Mountain, 46°00′02″N 113°23′56″W, el. 9,613 feet (2,930 m)
- Blizzard Hill, 46°15′07″N 112°34′17″W, el. 7,638 feet (2,328 m)
- Cottonwood Mountain, 46°13′19″N 112°38′28″W, el. 6,942 feet (2,116 m)
- East Goat Peak, 45°57′22″N 113°22′47″W, el. 10,390 feet (3,170 m)
- East Pintler Peak, 45°56′54″N 113°30′01″W, el. 9,442 feet (2,878 m)
- Fish Peak, 46°00′19″N 113°20′07″W, el. 10,197 feet (3,108 m)
- Garrity Mountain, 46°08′46″N 113°05′24″W, el. 8,045 feet (2,452 m)
- Gospel Hill, 46°14′27″N 112°36′15″W, el. 7,270 feet (2,220 m)
- Grassy Mountain, 46°01′48″N 113°00′51″W, el. 7,985 feet (2,434 m)
- Grouse Hill, 46°10′55″N 113°10′23″W, el. 7,116 feet (2,169 m)
- Hidden Lake Hill, 46°12′58″N 113°11′43″W, el. 7,716 feet (2,352 m)
- Johnson Hill, 46°12′37″N 113°08′19″W, el. 8,041 feet (2,451 m)
- Long Peak, 45°58′08″N 113°21′18″W, el. 9,521 feet (2,902 m)
- McGlaughlin Peak, 45°58′06″N 113°28′06″W, el. 9,478 feet (2,889 m)
- Mount Evans (Montana), 46°03′00″N 113°11′26″W, el. 10,594 feet (3,229 m)
- Mount Haggin, 46°05′14″N 113°05′47″W, el. 10,607 feet (3,233 m)
- Mount Howe, 46°02′53″N 113°12′59″W, el. 10,472 feet (3,192 m)
- Needle Peak, 45°57′56″N 113°20′43″W, el. 9,226 feet (2,812 m)
- Nipple Peak, 45°56′33″N 113°23′02″W, el. 9,662 feet (2,945 m)
- Olson Mountain, 46°12′27″N 113°04′42″W, el. 8,865 feet (2,702 m)
- Orofino Mountain, 46°14′29″N 112°38′35″W, el. 6,883 feet (2,098 m)
- Pine Hill, 45°50′21″N 113°20′45″W, el. 6,558 feet (1,999 m)
- Pintler Peak, 45°56′55″N 113°30′00″W, el. 9,478 feet (2,889 m)
- Queener Mountain, 46°01′24″N 113°18′03″W, el. 10,148 feet (3,093 m)
- Saddle Mountain, 45°57′33″N 113°23′15″W, el. 10,197 feet (3,108 m)
- Saratoga Mountain, 46°15′39″N 112°35′53″W, el. 6,952 feet (2,119 m)
- Short Peak, 46°03′34″N 113°06′25″W, el. 10,282 feet (3,134 m)
- Silver Hill, 46°08′24″N 113°13′57″W, el. 7,831 feet (2,387 m)
- Spring Hill, 46°10′37″N 113°10′17″W, el. 6,890 feet (2,100 m)
- Sugarloaf Mountain, 46°00′47″N 112°57′23″W, el. 7,677 feet (2,340 m)
- Tower Peak, 45°57′51″N 113°20′06″W, el. 8,809 feet (2,685 m)
- West Goat Peak, 45°57′46″N 113°23′42″W, el. 10,784 feet (3,287 m)
- Wraith Hill, 46°10′26″N 113°13′15″W, el. 7,201 feet (2,195 m)

== See also ==
- List of mountains in Montana
- List of mountain ranges in Montana
