= List of mountains in Yellowstone County, Montana =

There are at least 17 named mountains in Yellowstone County, Montana.

- Bender Hill, 46°16′13″N 107°38′58″W, el. 3,425 feet (1,044 m)
- Castle Butte, 46°08′26″N 107°56′58″W, el. 3,537 feet (1,078 m)
- Deer Point, 45°58′59″N 108°18′15″W, el. 3,268 feet (996 m)
- Fivemile Hill, 46°11′26″N 107°34′45″W, el. 3,363 feet (1,025 m)
- Lookout Point, 46°11′48″N 108°02′11″W, el. 3,625 feet (1,105 m)
- Mail Box Hill, 46°20′22″N 107°45′27″W, el. 3,527 feet (1,075 m)
- McCormick Hill, 45°32′17″N 108°33′20″W, el. 4,472 feet (1,363 m)
- Mexican Buttes, 46°17′04″N 107°40′50″W, el. 3,451 feet (1,052 m)
- Mud Butte, 46°12′56″N 107°48′52″W, el. 3,235 feet (986 m)
- Ninemile Hill, 45°50′58″N 108°34′50″W, el. 3,478 feet (1,060 m)
- Ninemile Hill, 46°15′15″N 107°38′14″W, el. 3,468 feet (1,057 m)
- Rattlesnake Butte, 45°54′28″N 108°26′17″W, el. 3,346 feet (1,020 m)
- Round Butte, 45°33′54″N 108°45′38″W, el. 4,071 feet (1,241 m)
- Steamboat Butte, 46°15′10″N 108°06′03″W, el. 3,875 feet (1,181 m)
- Stratford Hill, 45°31′07″N 108°35′54″W, el. 4,967 feet (1,514 m)
- Twin Buttes, 46°18′21″N 107°42′37″W, el. 3,533 feet (1,077 m)
- Woody Mountain, 45°31′13″N 108°11′57″W, el. 4,334 feet (1,321 m)

== See also ==
- List of mountains in Montana
- List of mountain ranges in Montana
