= List of mountains in Hill County, Montana =

There are at least 31 named mountains in Hill County, Montana.

- Bailey Peak, 48°11′18″N 109°43′23″W, el. 6,033 feet (1,839 m)
- Baldy Mountain, 48°08′55″N 109°39′03″W, el. 6,916 feet (2,108 m)
- Big John Butte, 48°12′09″N 109°33′01″W, el. 5,922 feet (1,805 m)
- Black Butte, 48°33′15″N 109°45′52″W, el. 2,739 feet (835 m)
- Black Butte, 48°47′58″N 110°30′08″W, el. 3,012 feet (918 m)
- Bowery Peak, 48°10′54″N 109°41′03″W, el. 6,102 feet (1,860 m)
- Brindle Calf Woman Butte, 48°24′37″N 109°33′29″W, el. 3,881 feet (1,183 m)
- Camels Back, 48°13′44″N 109°46′50″W, el. 4,859 feet (1,481 m)
- Cement Hill, 48°29′40″N 109°42′45″W, el. 3,173 feet (967 m)
- Eagle Rock, 48°21′43″N 109°40′08″W, el. 3,684 feet (1,123 m)
- Elk Peak, 48°09′14″N 109°41′52″W, el. 6,168 feet (1,880 m)
- Flagstaff Hill, 48°40′07″N 109°50′35″W, el. 2,946 feet (898 m)
- Gardipee Hill, 48°19′22″N 109°50′50″W, el. 3,625 feet (1,105 m)
- Haystack Mountain, 48°16′38″N 109°44′53″W, el. 4,721 feet (1,439 m)
- Indian Woman Butte, 48°30′14″N 109°43′39″W, el. 3,038 feet (926 m)
- Little Joe Peak, 48°09′23″N 109°42′54″W, el. 6,332 feet (1,930 m)
- Long George Peak, 48°13′04″N 109°41′42″W, el. 5,318 feet (1,621 m)
- Moses Mountain, 48°11′20″N 109°37′29″W, el. 5,722 feet (1,744 m)
- Mount Reynolds, 48°19′40″N 109°37′38″W, el. 4,698 feet (1,432 m)
- Number One Mountain, 48°20′21″N 109°44′38″W, el. 4,813 feet (1,467 m)
- Otis Mountain, 48°15′46″N 109°38′41″W, el. 4,741 feet (1,445 m)
- Piney Butte, 48°21′49″N 109°46′22″W, el. 3,727 feet (1,136 m)
- Rattlesnake Butte, 48°54′40″N 110°17′02″W, el. 2,894 feet (882 m)
- Rotary Hill, 48°19′39″N 109°40′22″W, el. 3,845 feet (1,172 m)
- Saddle Butte, 48°31′08″N 109°38′05″W, el. 3,104 feet (946 m)
- Saddle Butte, 48°42′56″N 110°04′22″W, el. 2,707 feet (825 m)
- Shambo Mountain, 48°17′09″N 109°38′58″W, el. 4,242 feet (1,293 m)
- Signal Butte, 48°56′42″N 109°48′01″W, el. 3,035 feet (925 m)
- Square Butte, 48°19′46″N 109°55′30″W, el. 3,625 feet (1,105 m)
- Watsons Knob, 48°19′06″N 109°43′22″W, el. 4,528 feet (1,380 m)
- Wellen Peak, 48°08′49″N 109°41′53″W, el. 6,335 feet (1,931 m)

== See also ==
- Bears Paw Mountains, which include most of these.
- List of mountains in Montana
- List of mountain ranges in Montana
