= Gold Hill Township =

Gold Hill Township may refer to one of the following places in the United States:

- Gold Hill Township, Gallatin County, Illinois
- Gold Hill Township, Rowan County, North Carolina
