= List of mountains in Garfield County, Montana =

There are at least 74 named mountains in Garfield County, Montana.

- Adams Rocky Butte, 47°13′11″N 107°20′46″W, el. 3,173 feet (967 m)
- Baker Point, 47°28′10″N 107°44′46″W, el. 2,766 feet (843 m)
- Baldy Butte, 47°33′38″N 107°07′47″W, el. 2,913 feet (888 m)
- Barney Pinnacle, 47°04′03″N 107°50′11″W, el. 3,110 feet (950 m)
- Battleship Butte, 47°14′39″N 107°44′22″W, el. 3,035 feet (925 m)
- Biscuit Butte, 47°29′11″N 107°04′14″W, el. 3,025 feet (922 m)
- Black Butte, 46°55′57″N 107°33′44″W, el. 3,271 feet (997 m)
- Black Hills, 46°55′20″N 106°39′50″W, el. 3,097 feet (944 m)
- Blazier Butte, 46°57′10″N 107°01′54″W, el. 3,291 feet (1,003 m)
- Boslough Butte, 47°11′32″N 107°20′11″W, el. 3,169 feet (966 m)
- Brownie Butte, 47°31′50″N 107°01′02″W, el. 2,874 feet (876 m)
- Brownie Butte, 47°39′45″N 106°34′11″W, el. 2,746 feet (837 m)
- Buffalo Hill, 47°35′07″N 106°46′00″W, el. 2,933 feet (894 m)
- Buffalo Scott Butte, 47°01′14″N 107°40′24″W, el. 3,015 feet (919 m)
- Cap Rock Butte, 47°28′23″N 107°39′27″W, el. 3,022 feet (921 m)
- Castle Butte, 47°06′46″N 107°42′11″W, el. 3,176 feet (968 m)
- Castle Butte, 47°24′26″N 107°01′50″W, el. 2,828 feet (862 m)
- Chalk Butte, 47°30′49″N 107°18′14″W, el. 3,232 feet (985 m)
- Coal Bank Hill, 47°42′55″N 106°28′41″W, el. 2,595 feet (791 m)
- Coffin Butte, 47°14′15″N 107°35′16″W, el. 3,133 feet (955 m)
- Cox Butte, 47°01′49″N 107°32′00″W, el. 3,104 feet (946 m)
- Crown Butte, 46°56′05″N 107°08′29″W, el. 3,563 feet (1,086 m)
- Darby Buttes, 47°09′39″N 106°54′00″W, el. 3,035 feet (925 m)
- Elephant Butte, 47°13′44″N 107°18′30″W, el. 3,117 feet (950 m)
- Emma Butte, 46°56′40″N 107°15′57″W, el. 3,419 feet (1,042 m)
- Fig Mountain, 47°02′47″N 107°01′13″W, el. 3,428 feet (1,045 m)
- Finley Butte, 47°18′23″N 107°46′42″W, el. 2,926 feet (892 m)
- Froehlich Butte, 47°01′13″N 107°44′23″W, el. 3,146 feet (959 m)
- Hawks Nest, 47°01′10″N 107°18′44″W, el. 3,510 feet (1,070 m)
- Haystack Butte, 47°24′31″N 107°06′19″W, el. 2,979 feet (908 m)
- Hook Rock, 47°20′24″N 106°16′24″W, el. 2,654 feet (809 m)
- Indian Rocks, 47°27′33″N 106°21′58″W, el. 2,467 feet (752 m)
- Joe Ott Butte, 47°02′01″N 107°05′58″W, el. 3,317 feet (1,011 m)
- Kirts Butte, 47°02′02″N 107°27′24″W, el. 3,353 feet (1,022 m)
- Lambs Butte, 47°26′09″N 106°25′27″W, el. 2,559 feet (780 m)
- Little Buffalo Hill, 47°41′02″N 106°49′02″W, el. 2,608 feet (795 m)
- Little Chalk Butte, 46°55′41″N 106°09′25″W, el. 2,923 feet (891 m)
- Maloney Hill, 47°33′09″N 106°53′32″W, el. 2,664 feet (812 m)
- Manlove Butte, 47°01′32″N 107°25′49″W, el. 3,471 feet (1,058 m)
- McGinnis Butte, 46°56′43″N 107°22′57″W, el. 3,474 feet (1,059 m)
- McGlen Buttes, 47°02′40″N 107°38′33″W, el. 2,969 feet (905 m)
- McGraw Butte, 46°59′20″N 106°50′07″W, el. 2,979 feet (908 m)
- McTwigan Butte, 47°00′39″N 107°43′28″W, el. 3,150 feet (960 m)
- Montgomery Hill, 46°51′40″N 106°38′27″W, el. 3,077 feet (938 m)
- Mother Butte, 46°56′51″N 106°55′53″W, el. 3,428 feet (1,045 m)
- Mows Butte, 47°01′35″N 107°27′47″W, el. 3,340 feet (1,020 m)
- Neiter Butte, 47°06′17″N 107°34′45″W, el. 3,238 feet (987 m)
- O'Day Butte, 47°05′44″N 107°32′48″W, el. 3,323 feet (1,013 m)
- Phillips Buttes, 47°01′41″N 106°35′16″W, el. 2,887 feet (880 m)
- Pikes Peak, 47°18′53″N 106°53′52″W, el. 2,700 feet (820 m)
- Rattlesnake Butte, 47°08′59″N 107°31′05″W, el. 3,314 feet (1,010 m)
- Red Buttes, 46°51′52″N 106°19′29″W, el. 3,031 feet (924 m)
- Robbers Roost, 47°00′21″N 107°19′37″W, el. 3,547 feet (1,081 m)
- Round Butte, 47°39′03″N 107°07′39″W, el. 2,828 feet (862 m)
- Sage Hen Buttes, 47°27′24″N 107°01′45″W, el. 3,005 feet (916 m)
- Sandage Buttes, 47°12′55″N 107°51′58″W, el. 3,022 feet (921 m)
- School Butte, 46°55′29″N 107°14′17″W, el. 3,455 feet (1,053 m)
- Signal Butte, 47°40′55″N 106°38′12″W, el. 2,736 feet (834 m)
- Smoky Butte, 47°19′55″N 107°04′58″W, el. 2,995 feet (913 m)
- Square Butte, 47°21′56″N 107°36′07″W, el. 3,054 feet (931 m)
- Square Butte, 47°42′24″N 106°30′12″W, el. 2,828 feet (862 m)
- Standing Rock, 47°24′21″N 106°19′10″W, el. 2,411 feet (735 m)
- Strop Butte, 47°06′04″N 107°44′47″W, el. 2,923 feet (891 m)
- Table Top, 47°35′18″N 107°35′31″W, el. 3,018 feet (920 m)
- Thomas Butte, 47°01′27″N 107°33′59″W, el. 3,018 feet (920 m)
- Three Buttes, 46°51′31″N 106°40′26″W, el. 3,156 feet (962 m)
- Timber Butte, 47°00′03″N 107°42′14″W, el. 3,176 feet (968 m)
- Tindall Divide, 47°11′08″N 107°38′03″W, el. 3,225 feet (983 m)
- Turner Butte, 47°00′09″N 107°40′42″W, el. 3,156 feet (962 m)
- Twin Butte, 47°02′43″N 107°47′05″W, el. 3,084 feet (940 m)
- Twin Buttes, 47°10′21″N 107°23′43″W, el. 3,281 feet (1,000 m)
- Twin Buttes, 47°14′32″N 106°10′46″W, el. 2,743 feet (836 m)
- Waddington Dome, 47°05′32″N 107°36′52″W, el. 3,310 feet (1,010 m)
- White Buttes, 47°18′03″N 106°16′31″W, el. 2,680 feet (820 m)

== See also ==
- List of mountains in Montana
- List of mountain ranges in Montana
