= Castle Butte Township, Pennington County, South Dakota =

Township in Pennington County, South Dakota

Coordinates: 43°46′41″N 102°5′28″W

Castle Butte Township is a township in Pennington County, in the U.S. state of South Dakota. Its population was 28 as of the 2010 census.
