= List of mountains in Sweet Grass County, Montana =

There are at least 53 named mountains in Sweet Grass County, Montana.

- Antelope Butte, 45°43′35″N 110°05′08″W, el. 5,151 feet (1,570 m)
- Battleship Butte, 46°05′41″N 110°06′27″W, el. 6,066 feet (1,849 m)
- Big Timber Peak, 46°01′28″N 110°15′42″W, el. 10,764 feet (3,281 m)
- Black Butte, 45°40′13″N 109°59′44″W, el. 6,119 feet (1,865 m)
- Black Butte, 46°03′46″N 110°10′26″W, el. 7,677 feet (2,340 m)
- Boone Mountain, 45°31′31″N 110°02′46″W, el. 8,943 feet (2,726 m)
- Breakneck Mountain, 45°20′33″N 110°09′21″W, el. 10,170 feet (3,100 m)
- Breakneck Plateau, 45°21′56″N 110°09′13″W, el. 9,314 feet (2,839 m)
- Castle Butte, 45°38′41″N 110°02′10″W, el. 6,286 feet (1,916 m)
- Chalice Peak, 45°18′44″N 110°04′28″W, el. 11,037 feet (3,364 m)
- Choo-heh-meen Hills, 45°49′29″N 109°40′41″W, el. 5,043 feet (1,537 m)
- Chrome Mountain, 45°26′27″N 110°08′23″W, el. 10,138 feet (3,090 m)
- Columbine Peak, 45°14′03″N 110°09′04″W, el. 8,350 feet (2,550 m)
- Contact Mountain, 45°28′08″N 110°08′17″W, el. 9,944 feet (3,031 m)
- Crazy Peak, 46°01′05″N 110°16′36″W, el. 11,178 feet (3,407 m)
- Derby Mountain, 45°35′00″N 109°52′49″W, el. 7,027 feet (2,142 m)
- Elk Mountain, 45°32′57″N 110°01′04″W, el. 8,376 feet (2,553 m)
- Ellis Mountain, 45°34′44″N 109°56′52″W, el. 7,451 feet (2,271 m)
- Enos Mountain, 45°34′07″N 110°03′01″W, el. 7,401 feet (2,256 m)
- Evergreen Mountain, 45°35′59″N 109°58′06″W, el. 7,139 feet (2,176 m)
- Fairview Peak, 45°57′23″N 110°16′40″W, el. 10,167 feet (3,099 m)
- Gold Hill, 45°36′06″N 109°56′28″W, el. 6,234 feet (1,900 m)
- Hawley Mountain, 45°20′17″N 110°11′23″W, el. 10,092 feet (3,076 m)
- Haystack Peak, 45°11′47″N 110°12′25″W, el. 10,233 feet (3,119 m)
- Hicks Mountain, 45°32′44″N 109°52′57″W, el. 7,438 feet (2,267 m)
- Hicks Peak, 45°17′37″N 110°12′05″W, el. 9,803 feet (2,988 m)
- Independence Peak, 45°12′43″N 110°13′21″W, el. 9,885 feet (3,013 m)
- Iron Mountain, 45°24′16″N 110°03′49″W, el. 10,026 feet (3,056 m)
- Iron Mountain, 45°36′38″N 109°56′04″W, el. 6,857 feet (2,090 m)
- Jordan Mountain, 45°14′48″N 110°04′03″W, el. 10,102 feet (3,079 m)
- Kid Royal Mountain, 45°55′46″N 110°13′45″W, el. 6,893 feet (2,101 m)
- Knob Hill, 46°00′14″N 109°27′51″W, el. 4,534 feet (1,382 m)
- Lake Mountain, 45°17′25″N 110°06′43″W, el. 10,689 feet (3,258 m)
- Lone Indian Butte, 45°51′41″N 109°39′10″W, el. 5,174 feet (1,577 m)
- Meyer Mountain, 45°28′33″N 109°58′26″W, el. 8,248 feet (2,514 m)
- Monument Peak, 45°11′47″N 110°13′21″W, el. 10,846 feet (3,306 m)
- Morning Star Peak, 45°30′59″N 110°02′34″W, el. 9,255 feet (2,821 m)
- Mount Douglas, 45°18′24″N 110°08′23″W, el. 11,283 feet (3,439 m)
- Packsaddle Butte, 45°38′07″N 109°51′24″W, el. 5,902 feet (1,799 m)
- Piano Hill, 45°43′21″N 109°55′50″W, el. 4,974 feet (1,516 m)
- Picket Pin Mountain, 45°27′00″N 110°03′04″W, el. 9,977 feet (3,041 m)
- Pinnacle Mountain, 45°11′47″N 110°06′07″W, el. 10,666 feet (3,251 m)
- Porcupine Butte, 46°10′45″N 110°04′22″W, el. 7,011 feet (2,137 m)
- Raspberry Butte, 45°58′33″N 110°10′07″W, el. 6,653 feet (2,028 m)
- Red Mountain, 45°38′16″N 109°58′16″W, el. 5,978 feet (1,822 m)
- Sliderock Mountain, 45°35′10″N 109°56′59″W, el. 7,506 feet (2,288 m)
- Snowy Peak, 45°19′05″N 110°08′31″W, el. 9,623 feet (2,933 m)
- Stephens Hill, 45°50′40″N 109°34′24″W, el. 4,928 feet (1,502 m)
- Sugarloaf Mountain, 45°31′58″N 109°55′56″W, el. 7,946 feet (2,422 m)
- Tepee Mountain, 45°31′01″N 110°11′00″W, el. 8,117 feet (2,474 m)
- Timberline Mountain, 45°10′45″N 110°03′45″W, el. 10,253 feet (3,125 m)
- Washburn Mountain, 45°29′48″N 109°57′44″W, el. 8,353 feet (2,546 m)
- Wheeler Butte, 46°02′30″N 109°58′03″W, el. 4,961 feet (1,512 m)

== See also ==
- List of mountains in Montana
- List of mountain ranges in Montana
