= Three Buttes =

Mountains in Montana, United States

- Location within Montana

Highest point
- Elevation: 3,848 ft (1,173 m)
- Coordinates: 48°10′34″N 108°45′00″W

Geography
- Country: United States
- State: Montana

The Three Buttes, el. 3,848 feet (1,173 m), are buttes or small, flat-topped hills northwest of Lodge Pole, Montana in Blaine County, Montana.

== See also ==
- List of mountain ranges in Montana
