= Butcher Hill (disambiguation) =

Butcher Hill is a 1989 video game.

Butcher Hill or Butchers Hill may also refer to:

- Butcher Hill (West Virginia), US, a summit
- Butcher Hill Historic District, West Virginia, US
- Butcher Hill, running between Hawksworth and West Park in Leeds, England
- Butcher Hills, a range in Montana, US
- Butchers Hill, Baltimore, US, a neighborhood of Baltimore, Maryland
- Butcher's Hill (cattle station), in Lakeland, Queensland, Australia
