= Opheim =

Opheim may refer to:

- Opheim (surname), several people
- Opheim, Norway, a village in Ål. Buskerud County, Norway
- Opheim, Montana, a town in Valley County, Montana
  - Opheim Air Force Station a former US Air Force facility near Opheim, Montana
  - Opheim Hills, a range of Hills near Opheim, Montana

== See also ==
- Ophiem, Illinois
