= Canyon Ferry Dam =

Dam in Montana, US

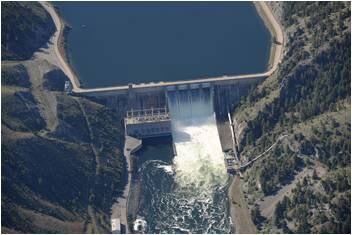

- Location of the dam in Montana, USA
- Country: United States
- Location: Lewis and Clark County, Montana, USA
- Coordinates: 46°38′54″N 111°43′39″W
- Status: Operational
- Construction began: May 24, 1949
- Opening date: June 23, 1954
- Owner: U.S. Bureau of Reclamation

Dam and spillways
- Type of dam: Gravity
- Impounds: Missouri River
- Height: 225 ft (69 m)
- Length: 1,000 ft (305 m)
- Width (crest): 20 ft (6 m)
- Width (base): 173 ft (53 m)
- Dam volume: 414,400 cu yd (316,832 m^{3})
- Spillway type: Service, four controlled-gates
- Spillway capacity: 150,000 cu ft/s (4,248 m^{3}/s)

Reservoir
- Creates: Canyon Ferry Lake
- Total capacity: 1,997,900 acre⋅ft (2.4644 km^{3})
- Normal elevation: 3,797 ft (1,157 m)

Power Station
- Commission date: 1953–1954
- Turbines: 3 x 16.5 MW Francis-type
- Installed capacity: 50 MW
- Annual generation: 277,052,777 KWh

Canyon Ferry Dam is a concrete gravity dam in a narrow valley of the Missouri River, United States, where the Big Belt Mountains and the Spokane Hills merge, approximately 68 miles (109 km) downstream from the confluence of the Gallatin, Madison, and Jefferson rivers, and about 20 miles (32 km) east of the city of Helena, Montana. The dam is for flood control, irrigation, recreation and hydroelectric power. The building of the dam created a reservoir known as Canyon Ferry Lake.

== Background ==
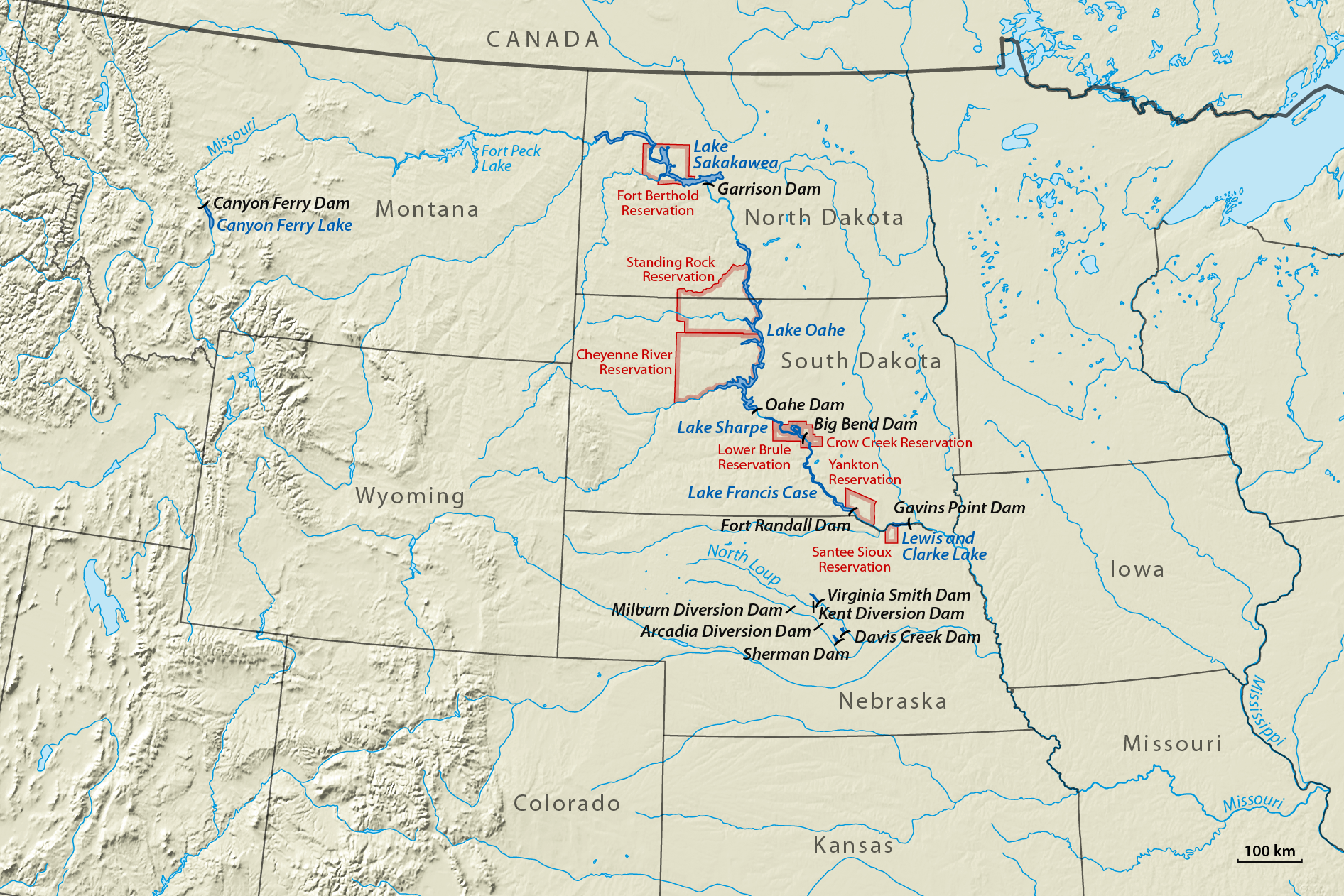
Canyon Ferry and other dams built in the Pick–Sloan Program

In 1941, the first study for the dam was carried out by the Bureau of Reclamation, the Montana Water Board and Montana Power Company. The dam and power plant were part of the Pick-Sloan Plan and approved by the Flood Control Act of 1944 which was signed on December 22. Known as the Canyon Ferry Unit, construction began on May 24, 1949, and was completed on June 23, 1954. On December 18, 1953, the power plant's first generator became operational and the other two went online in 1954.

The 1949 structure replaced the original Canyon Ferry Dam 1.5 mi (2 km) upstream. The original dam was constructed between 1896 and 1898 by the Helena Water and Electric Power Company. It was a timber crib dam with rock-fill and was 29 ft (9 m) high and 485 ft (148 m) long.

== Design ==
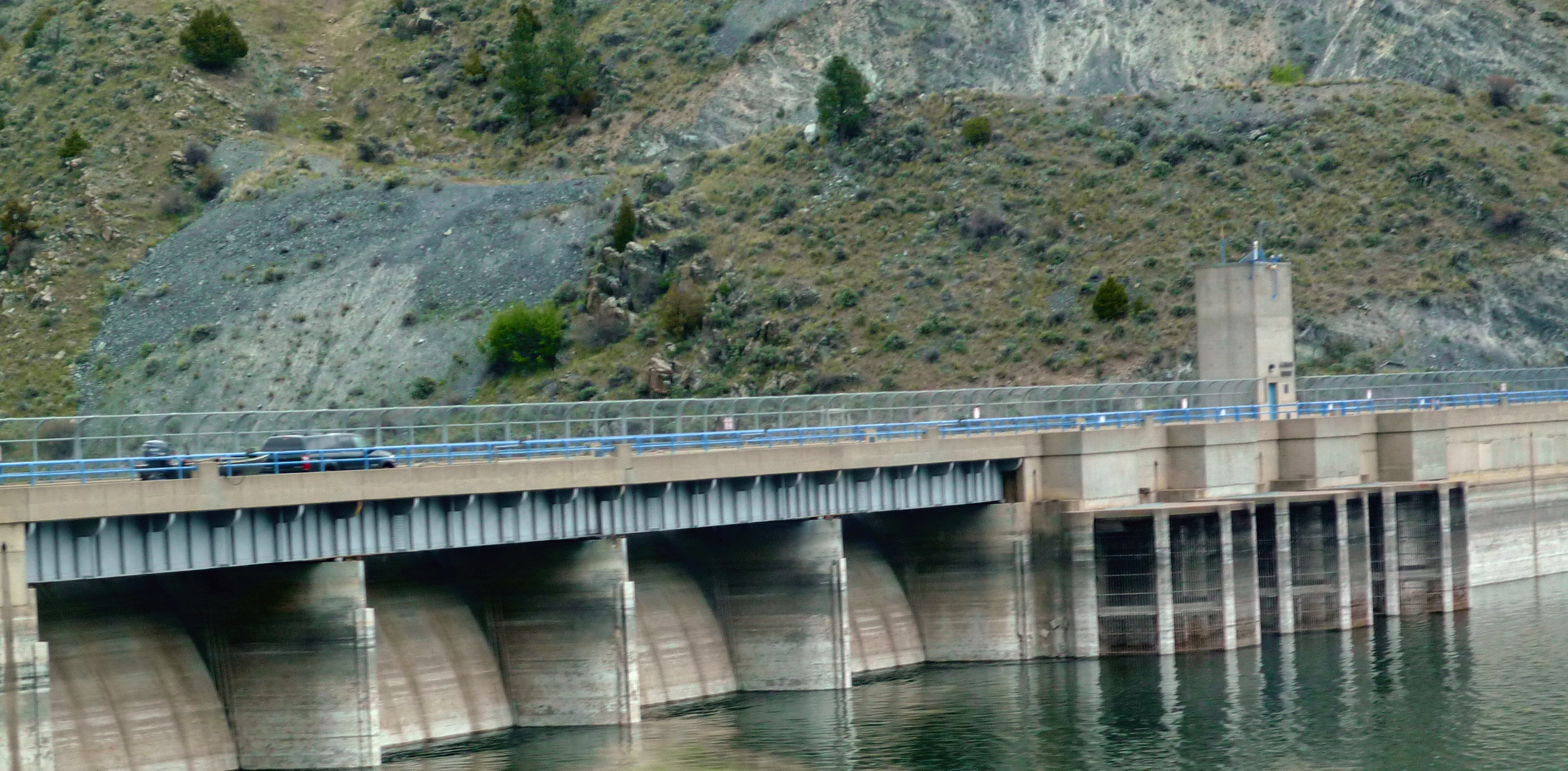
Dam from lake side

The dam is a 225 ft (69 m) tall concrete gravity type and has a length of 1,000 ft (305 m). The crest of the dam is 20 ft (6 m) while the base is 173 ft (53 m). The dam structure compromises a total of 414,400 cu yd (316,832 m^{3}) of concrete. The dam's spillway is located on its central portion and is controlled by four radial gates. It has a maximum discharge of 150,000 cu ft/s (4,248 m^{3}/s). Adjacent to the spillway is the dam's power plant which contains three 16.5 MW Francis turbine generators for an installed capacity of 50 MW. Each turbine is fed with water by a 13.5 ft (4 m) diameter penstock. At a normal elevation of 3,797 ft (1,157 m), the reservoir contains 1,891,000 acre⋅ft (2.332514155×10^{9} m^{3}) of water.
