= List of mountain ranges in Wyoming =

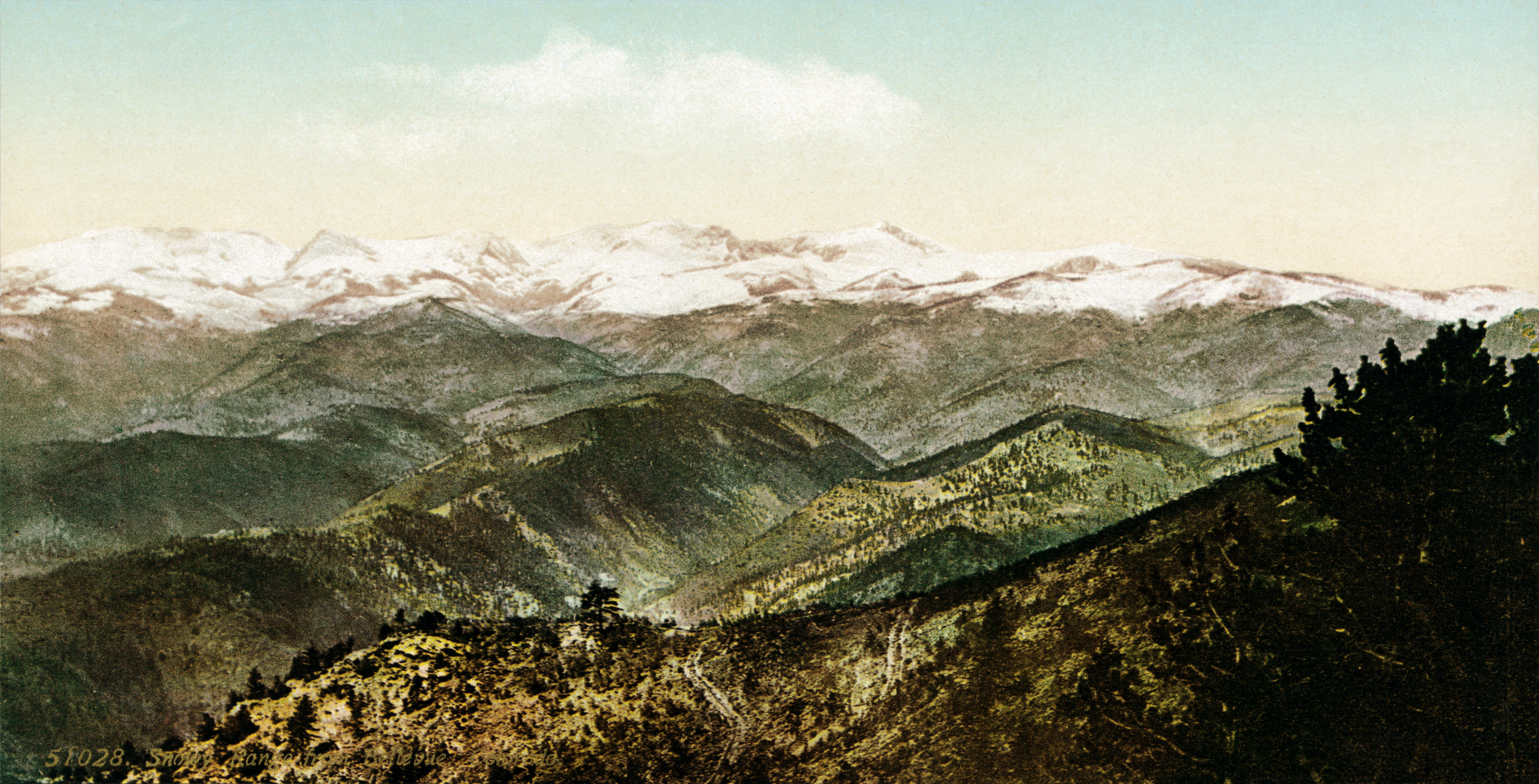
Snowy Range, Albany County, Wyoming

According to the United States Board on Geographic Names, there are at least 109 named mountain ranges and sub-ranges in Wyoming.

Wyoming /waɪˈoʊmɪŋ/ is a state in the mountain region of the Western United States. Wyoming is the 10th most extensive, but the least populous and the 2nd least densely populated of the 50 United States. The western two thirds of the state is covered mostly with the mountain ranges and rangelands in the foothills of the Eastern Rocky Mountains, while the eastern third of the state is high elevation prairie known as the High Plains.

== The list ==
Name	County	Elevation	Coordinates	Ref
Absaroka Range	Park County	13,140 feet (4,010 m)	43°57′40″N 109°20′21″W	
Badger Hills	Sheridan County	4,455 feet (1,358 m)	44°57′46″N 106°38′39″W	
Badlands Hills	Sweetwater County	6,417 feet (1,956 m)	41°50′42″N 109°40′11″W	
Bald Range	Uinta County	8,025 feet (2,446 m)	41°00′42″N 110°06′59″W	
Bear Lodge Mountains	Crook County	4,508 feet (1,374 m)	44°38′00″N 104°23′02″W	
Beartooth Mountains	Park County	12,693 feet (3,869 m)	45°09′48″N 109°48′29″W	
Beaver Creek Hills	Sheridan County	8,356 feet (2,547 m)	44°43′21″N 107°03′15″W	
Bighorn Mountains	Johnson County	8,733 feet (2,662 m)	44°30′01″N 107°15′03″W	
Bridger Mountains	Fremont County	7,109 feet (2,167 m)	43°29′30″N 107°59′02″W	
Buck Creek Hills	Niobrara County	4,308 feet (1,313 m)	43°08′42″N 104°24′35″W	
Buck Creek V S	Big Horn County	8,579 feet (2,615 m)	44°16′12″N 107°21′29″W	
Castle Gardens	Fremont County	5,909 feet (1,801 m)	42°57′13″N 107°40′01″W	
Coalbank Hills	Natrona County	6,604 feet (2,013 m)	42°55′10″N 107°20′58″W	
Cow Creek Breaks	Campbell County	4,541 feet (1,384 m)	44°30′48″N 105°19′06″W	
Deer Creek Breaks	Campbell County	4,439 feet (1,353 m)	44°21′51″N 105°17′47″W	
Deer Creek Range	Natrona County	8,264 feet (2,519 m)	42°34′46″N 106°09′52″W	
Duck Creek Breaks	Campbell County	3,835 feet (1,169 m)	44°44′06″N 105°08′37″W	
Edmo Buttes	Fremont County	5,420 feet (1,650 m)	43°07′08″N 108°40′27″W	
Ferris Mountains	Carbon County	9,983 feet (3,043 m)	42°15′23″N 107°14′21″W	
Flattop Buttes	Sweetwater County	7,326 feet (2,233 m)	42°15′45″N 108°10′14″W}	
Fort Steele Breaks	Carbon County	7,251 feet (2,210 m)	41°48′04″N 106°56′34″W	
Freak Mountains	Fremont County	8,861 feet (2,701 m)	42°38′50″N 108°47′46″W	
Freezeout Mountains	Carbon County	7,306 feet (2,227 m)	42°02′09″N 106°23′26″W	
Gallatin Range	Park County	9,003 feet (2,744 m)	44°55′00″N 110°53′03″W	
Gannett Hills	Lincoln County	7,907 feet (2,410 m)	42°33′36″N 111°04′14″W	
Gas Hills	Fremont County	6,371 feet (1,942 m)	42°50′29″N 107°36′00″W	
Granite Mountains	Fremont County	7,388 feet (2,252 m)	42°31′12″N 107°36′06″W	
Green Mountains	Teton County	7,844 feet (2,391 m)	42°22′36″N 107°48′57″W	
Gros Ventre Range	Hot Springs County	9,997 feet (3,047 m)	43°22′29″N 110°30′04″W	
Gumbo Hills	Niobrara County	5,381 feet (1,640 m)	43°45′58″N 108°30′47″W	
Hamilton Hills	Niobrara County	4,915 feet (1,498 m)	42°56′41″N 104°45′11″W	
Harney Hills	Niobrara County	5,282 feet (1,610 m)	42°51′48″N 104°51′25″W	
Haystack Mountains	Carbon County	7,762 feet (2,366 m)	41°55′05″N 107°07′27″W	
Haystack Range	Goshen County	5,646 feet (1,721 m)	42°20′29″N 104°38′06″W	
Haystacks	Natrona County	5,843 feet (1,781 m)	42°58′36″N 106°47′18″W	
Hells Half Acre	Natrona County	5,879 feet (1,792 m)	43°02′17″N 107°05′35″W	
Honeycomb Buttes	Sweetwater County	7,346 feet (2,239 m)	42°14′18″N 108°36′57″W	
Horseshoe Hills	Niobrara County	5,269 feet (1,606 m)	42°50′54″N 104°42′22″W	
Ishawooa Hills	Park County	6,565 feet (2,001 m)	44°15′35″N 109°31′27″W	
Jack Morrow Hills	Sweetwater County	7,707 feet (2,349 m)	42°10′02″N 109°03′35″W	
Kirkland Mountains	Fremont County	11,430 feet (3,480 m)	43°09′17″N 109°25′11″W	
Laramie Mountains	Albany County	8,540 feet (2,600 m)	41°31′36″N 105°29′59″W	
Lavender Hills	Teton County	8,517 feet (2,596 m)	43°37′54″N 110°26′20″W	
Leucite Hills	Sweetwater County	7,648 feet (2,331 m)	41°49′19″N 108°59′48″W	
Little Mitchell Creek Breaks	Campbell County	4,019 feet (1,225 m)	44°30′10″N 105°09′13″W	
Medicine Bow Breaks	Carbon County	6,709 feet (2,045 m)	41°59′10″N 106°34′16″W	
Medicine Lodge Big Game Winter Range	Big Horn County	6,637 feet (2,023 m)	44°21′43″N 107°30′04″W	
Miller Hills	Converse County	4,931 feet (1,503 m)	43°21′11″N 104°57′36″W	
Mine Hills	Albany County	7,710 feet (2,350 m)	42°15′27″N 105°49′21″W	
Mitchell Creek Breaks	Campbell County	4,219 feet (1,286 m)	44°32′13″N 105°09′06″W	
Moneta Hills	Fremont County	5,794 feet (1,766 m)	43°12′23″N 107°44′09″W	
Moore Spring Hills	Goshen County	5,141 feet (1,567 m)	42°28′19″N 104°34′34″W	
Old Woman Creek Hills	Niobrara County	4,426 feet (1,349 m)	43°08′23″N 104°18′41″W	
Oregon Buttes	Sweetwater County	8,606 feet (2,623 m)	42°15′17″N 108°51′27″W	
Owl Creek Mountains	Fremont County	6,811 feet (2,076 m)	43°28′47″N 108°31′04″W	
Owl Hills	Fremont County	7,917 feet (2,413 m)	42°22′43″N 107°39′46″W	
Pedro Mountains	Carbon County	7,812 feet (2,381 m)	42°19′50″N 106°50′51″W	
Powder River Breaks	Johnson County	4,626 feet (1,410 m)	43°58′34″N 106°15′56″W	
Powder River Breaks	Sheridan County	3,944 feet (1,202 m)	44°47′50″N 106°03′47″W	
Prairie Dog Hills	Campbell County	3,770 feet (1,150 m)	44°59′35″N 105°17′15″W	
Prospect Mountains	Sublette County	8,238 feet (2,511 m)	42°28′37″N 109°08′53″W	
Pumpkin Buttes	Campbell County	5,945 feet (1,812 m)	43°42′55″N 105°52′21″W	
Rattlesnake Hills	Natrona County	7,848 feet (2,392 m)	42°49′14″N 107°21′09″W	
Rawhide Buttes	Goshen County	5,249 feet (1,600 m)	42°34′25″N 104°29′59″W	
Red Hills	Converse County	4,662 feet (1,421 m)	43°28′04″N 105°15′46″W	
Red Hills	Lincoln County	7,126 feet (2,172 m)	42°42′47″N 110°04′58″W	
Red Hills	Johnson County	4,675 feet (1,425 m)	44°03′02″N 106°34′21″W	
Red Hills	Campbell County	4,301 feet (1,311 m)	44°57′37″N 105°25′15″W	
Red Hills	Teton County	6,640 feet (2,020 m)	42°21′34″N 107°30′04″W	
Red Hills	Sublette County	9,754 feet (2,973 m)	43°21′13″N 110°12′54″W	
Red Hills	Teton County	7,900 feet (2,400 m)	43°37′38″N 110°27′58″W	
Red Mountains	Teton County	9,711 feet (2,960 m)	44°15′11″N 110°33′13″W	
Richeau Hills	Platte County	6,493 feet (1,979 m)	41°48′42″N 105°03′38″W	
Rocky Mountains	Teton County	7,388 feet (2,252 m)	43°21′30″N 110°55′03″W	
Saddleback Hills	Carbon County	7,480 feet (2,280 m)	41°44′52″N 106°26′28″W	
Salt River Range	Lincoln County	7,336 feet (2,236 m)	42°45′01″N 110°50′03″W	
Sand Hills	Carbon County	7,218 feet (2,200 m)	41°49′05″N 106°32′41″W	
Sand Hills	Fremont County	4,928 feet (1,502 m)	43°15′38″N 108°13′20″W	
Sand Hills	Fremont County	5,758 feet (1,755 m)	42°54′00″N 108°44′24″W	
Savage Hills	Carbon County	6,755 feet (2,059 m)	41°40′45″N 106°55′29″W	
Seaman Hills	Niobrara County	4,685 feet (1,428 m)	42°59′38″N 104°14′16″W	
Seminoe Mountains	Carbon County	7,431 feet (2,265 m)	42°09′04″N 106°49′31″W	
Session Mountains	Uinta County	6,827 feet (2,081 m)	41°33′41″N 111°00′52″W	
Seventy-Seven Hills	Niobrara County	5,508 feet (1,679 m)	42°51′17″N 104°36′58″W	
Shamrock Hills	Carbon County	6,959 feet (2,121 m)	41°54′47″N 107°25′29″W	
Sheep Mountain	Big Horn County	4,826 feet (1,471 m)	44°36′04″N 108°07′05″W	
Sherman Mountains	Albany County	8,468 feet (2,581 m)	41°11′45″N 105°22′57″W	
Sherrill Hills	Niobrara County	4,541 feet (1,384 m)	42°54′23″N 104°04′23″W	
Shirley Mountains	Carbon County	8,077 feet (2,462 m)	42°06′25″N 106°35′51″W	
Sierra Madre	Carbon County	10,961 feet (3,341 m)	41°11′21″N 107°02′50″W	
Snake River Range	Teton County	10,025 feet (3,056 m)	43°24′57″N 110°57′43″W	
Snowy Range	Albany and Carbon Counties	12,014 feet (3,662 m)	41°20′52″N 106°19′34″W	
Sublette Range	Lincoln County	7,848 feet (2,392 m)	42°23′07″N 111°01′14″W	
T A Hills	Johnson County	5,161 feet (1,573 m)	44°08′12″N 106°39′42″W	
Tepee Mountains	Sweetwater County	7,339 feet (2,237 m)	41°00′09″N 109°10′05″W	
Teton Range	Teton County	9,252 feet (2,820 m)	43°45′05″N 110°53′03″W	
The Brakes	Crook County	3,832 feet (1,168 m)	44°36′45″N 104°06′48″W	
The Breaks	Carbon County	6,621 feet (2,018 m)	41°59′11″N 106°24′56″W	
The Palisades	Park County	8,274 feet (2,522 m)	44°36′05″N 109°21′03″W	
The Sand Hills	Carbon County	7,369 feet (2,246 m)	41°26′22″N 107°32′46″W	
The Vees	Washakie County	6,355 feet (1,937 m)	43°50′41″N 107°13′26″W	
Three Brothers Mountains	Teton County	7,116 feet (2,169 m)	44°37′59″N 110°53′16″W	
Tunp Range	Lincoln County	8,346 feet (2,544 m)	42°13′17″N 110°48′23″W	
Twin Hills	Goshen County	4,816 feet (1,468 m)	42°24′35″N 104°33′48″W	
Twin Mountains	Laramie County	8,081 feet (2,463 m)	41°02′54″N 105°16′03″W	
Wanker Hills	Niobrara County	5,669 feet (1,728 m)	42°41′31″N 104°34′16″W	
Washburn Range	Park County	9,212 feet (2,808 m)	44°50′08″N 110°34′11″W	
Wildcat Hills	Goshen County	5,679 feet (1,731 m)	42°30′23″N 104°37′34″W	
Wind River Range	Sublette County	10,709 feet (3,264 m)	43°00′00″N 109°30′03″W	
Wyoming Range	Lincoln County	9,593 feet (2,924 m)	42°44′02″N 110°36′46″W	

== See also ==
- Mountains and mountain ranges of Yellowstone National Park
- Mountain passes in Wyoming (A-J)
- Mountain passes in Wyoming (K-Y)
