= Boulder Mountains =

Boulder Mountains may refer to:

- Boulder Mountains (Idaho)
- Boulder Mountains (Montana)
