= Franklin Hills =

Franklin Hills may refer to:

- Franklin Hills, Los Angeles, a small community in the City of Los Angeles, California
- Franklin Hills (Montana), southeast of Melville, Montana
