= Boulder Mountain =

There are many mountains called Boulder Mountain, including:

- Boulder Mountain (Colorado), high mountain summit
- Boulder Mountain (Utah), a high plateau in central Utah, near Capitol Reef National Park
- Boulder Mountain (British Columbia) near Tulameen, British Columbia, Canada
- Boulder Mountain (Monashee Mountains) near Revelstoke, British Columbia
- Boulder Mountains (Montana) - a range west of Helena, Montana
- Boulder Mountains (Idaho) - a range in central Idaho, north of Sun Valley
