= Spokane Hills =

Set of hills in Montana, United States

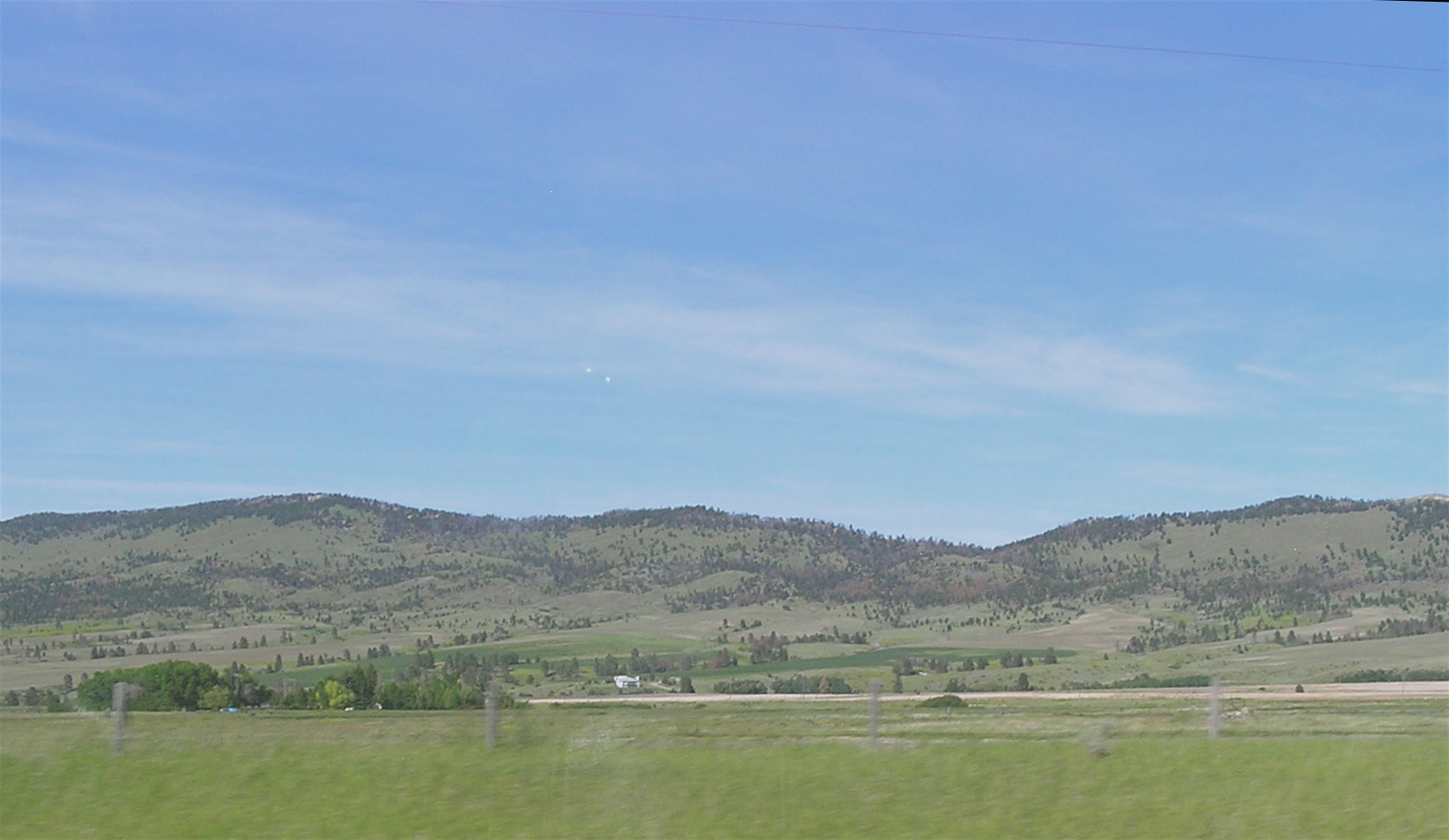
- West side of Spokane hills viewed from Highway 12 near East Helena, Montana

Highest point
- Elevation: 4,858 ft (1,481 m)
- Coordinates: 46°37′02″N 111°46′14″W

Geography
- Location within Montana
- Country: United States
- State: Montana

The Spokane Hills, el. 4,058 feet (1,237 m), is a set of major foothills of the Big Belt Mountains to the east of Helena, Montana in Lewis and Clark County, Montana. They lie between the Helena Valley and Canyon Ferry Reservoir.

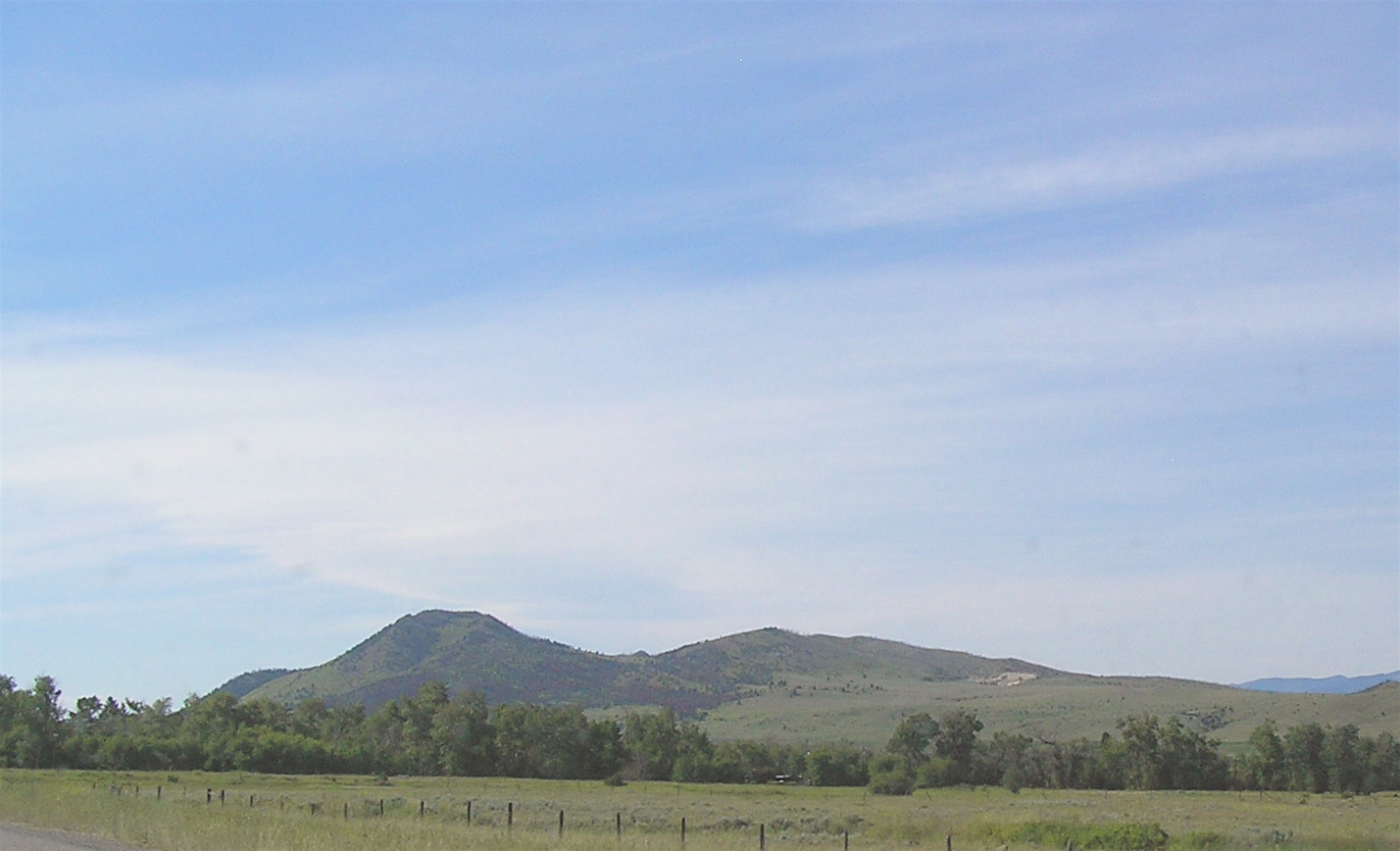
Southeast end of Spokane hills viewed near Winston, Montana

== See also ==
- List of mountain ranges in Montana
