= Cayoosh =

Cayoosh, derived from Spanish caballo like cayuse, is a placename in British Columbia, Canada. It may refer to:

- the basin of Cayoosh Creek, sometimes spelled Cayuse. Also used in reference to Cayoosh Canyon, which is the lower valley of that creek.
- the Cayoosh Range, a.k.a. "the high Cayoosh"
- Cayoosh Flat, often only Cayoosh, the original name of the town of Lillooet, British Columbia
- Cayoosh Mountain, a summit in the western Cayoosh Range near the Place Glacier
- Cayoosh Falls, a now-inundated waterfall submerged by a private hydroelectric development on Cayoosh Creek

The name often figures in the names of local organizations and businesses:

- the Cayuse Creek Indian Band (Sekwelwas First Nation); the spelling Kiy-oose is sometimes used in this context.
- Cayoosh Elementary School in Lillooet
- Cayoosh Heights, a neighbourhood of Lillooet
- the Cayoosh ski area proposal (or Cayoosh Resort at Melvin Creek, a tributary of Cayoosh Creek
- the Cayoosh Creek campground operated by BC Hydro at Seton Lake
