= Flat Tops =

Flat Tops may refer to:

- Flat Tops, a summit in Imperial County, California, United States
- The Flat Tops (Utah), a summit in Emery County, Utah, United States
- Flat Tops (Colorado), a mountain range in Garfield, Routt, and Rio Blanco Counties, Colorado, United States
- The Flattops (Arizona), a summit in Apache County, Arizona, United States
- Flattops (Montana), a range in Carter County, Montana, United States
- A slang term for U.S. Navy aircraft carriers

== See also ==
- Flat Tops Wilderness
