= Limestone Hills (Montana) =

- Location within Montana

Highest point
- Elevation: 4,977 ft (1,517 m)
- Coordinates: 46°14′59″N 111°37′34″W

Geography
- Country: United States
- State: Montana

The Limestone Hills, el. 4,977 feet (1,517 m), is a sub-range of the Big Belt Mountains southwest of Townsend, Montana in Broadwater County, Montana.

== See also ==
- List of mountain ranges in Montana
