= The Pinnacles (Montana) =

- Location within Montana

Highest point
- Elevation: 6,545 ft (1,995 m)
- Coordinates: 47°02′53″N 111°38′35″W

Geography
- Country: United States
- State: Montana

The Pinnacles, el. 6,545 feet (1,995 m), is a set of mountain peaks within the Big Belt Mountains east of Craig, Montana in Cascade County, Montana.

== See also ==
- List of mountain ranges in Montana
