= Flathead Alps =

- Location within Montana

Highest point
- Elevation: 8,337 ft (2,541 m)
- Coordinates: 47°30′40″N 113°09′24″W

Geography
- Country: United States
- State: Montana

The Flathead Alps, el. 8,337 feet (2,541 m), is a small mountain range northeast of Seeley Lake, Montana in northeastern Powell County, Montana. The range is located primarily within the Bob Marshall Wilderness.

== See also ==
- List of mountain ranges in Montana
