= Milk River Hills =

Hills in Montana, United States

- Location within Montana

Highest point
- Elevation: 2,644 ft (806 m)
- Coordinates: 48°01′43″N 106°18′07″W

Geography
- Country: United States
- State: Montana

The Milk River Hills, el. 2,644 feet (806 m), is a set of hills east of Fort Peck, Montana in McCone County, Montana.

== See also ==
- List of mountain ranges in Montana
