= Buck Mountain (Montana) =

Mountain in Custer County, Montana, United States

Highest point
- Elevation: 1,010 m (3,310 ft)
- Prominence: 384 ft (117 m)
- Coordinates: 46°27′43.09″N 105°26′17.30″W

Geography
- Location: Custer County, Montana
- Parent range: The Pine Hills

Buck Mountain is a small mountain located in Custer County, Montana. Standing at 1,010 metres (3,310 ft), it is the tallest summit in the The Pine Hills. It is 19 miles from Miles City, MT and ten miles from the Strawberry Hill Recreation Area.
