= Papoose Hills =

- Location within Montana

Highest point
- Elevation: 2,815 ft (858 m)
- Coordinates: 48°39′30″N 107°05′23″W

Geography
- Country: United States
- State: Montana

The Papoose Hills, el. 2,815 feet (858 m), is a set of hills northwest of Glasgow, Montana in Valley County, Montana.

== See also ==
- List of mountain ranges in Montana
