= Wilson Range =

Mountain range in Montana, United States

- Location within Montana

Highest point
- Elevation: 7,119 ft (2,170 m)
- Coordinates: 48°59′00″N 113°51′00″W

Geography
- Country: United States
- State: Montana

The Wilson Range, el. 7,119 feet (2,170 m), is a small mountain range in the northeast corner of Glacier National Park (U.S.) in Glacier County, Montana that parallels the international boundary with Canada. The range was named for Lt. Charles William Wilson (1836–1905) who was secretary to the British Boundary Commission (1858–1862).

== See also ==
- List of mountain ranges in Montana
- Mountains and mountain ranges of Glacier National Park (U.S.)
