= Piney Buttes =

Mountain ramge in Montana, United States

- Location within Montana

Highest point
- Elevation: 2,651 ft (808 m)
- Coordinates: 47°27′30″N 106°47′02″W

Geography
- Country: United States
- State: Montana

The Piney Buttes, el. 2,651 feet (808 m), are a set of flat-topped hills, or buttes northeast of Jordan, Montana in Garfield County, Montana.

== See also ==
- List of mountain ranges in Montana
