= Dry Range =

Mountain range in Montana, United States

- Location within Montana

Highest point
- Elevation: 6,152 ft (1,875 m)
- Coordinates: 46°48′00″N 111°17′03″W

Geography
- Country: United States
- State: Montana

The Dry Range, el. 6,152 feet (1,875 m), is a small mountain range northwest of White Sulphur Springs, Montana in Meagher County, Montana.

== See also ==
- List of mountain ranges in Montana
