= Humbolt Hills =

- Location within Montana

Highest point
- Elevation: 3,314 ft (1,010 m)
- Coordinates: 45°49′29″N 104°06′24″W

Geography
- Country: United States
- State: Montana

The Humbolt Hills, el. 3,314 feet (1,010 m), is a set of hills northeast of Ekalaka, Montana in Carter County, Montana.

== See also ==
- List of mountain ranges in Montana
