= Honeycomb Hills =

Set of hills in Montana

- Location within Montana

Highest point
- Elevation: 3,094 ft (943 m)
- Coordinates: 45°36′07″N 105°00′21″W

Geography
- Country: United States
- State: Montana

The Honeycomb Hills, el. 3,094 feet (943 m), is a set of hills southeast of Powderville, Montana in Powder River County, Montana.

== See also ==
- List of mountain ranges in Montana
