= Calderwood Hills =

- Location within Montana

Highest point
- Elevation: 2,799 ft (853 m)
- Coordinates: 48°27′48″N 106°23′52″W

Geography
- Country: United States
- State: Montana

The Calderwood Hills, el. 2,799 feet (853 m), is a set of hills northeast of Glasgow, Montana in Valley County, Montana.

== See also ==
- List of mountain ranges in Montana
