= Rocky Hills =

- Location within Montana

Highest point
- Elevation: 6,916 ft (2,108 m)
- Coordinates: 45°04′13″N 112°58′44″W

Geography
- Country: United States
- State: Montana

The Rocky Hills, elevation 6,916 feet (2,108 m), is a small mountain range south of Bannack, Montana in Beaverhead County, Montana.

== See also ==
- List of mountain ranges in Montana
