= Little Snowy Mountains =

Mountain range in Montana, United States

- Location within Montana

Highest point
- Elevation: 6,240 ft (1,900 m)
- Coordinates: 46°45′8″N 109°10′24″W

Dimensions
- Length: 16 mi (26 km) E-W
- Width: 6 mi (9.7 km) N-S

Geography
- Country: United States
- State: Montana
- Counties: Fergus, Golden Valley and Musselshell
- Range coordinates: 46°47′N 108°59′W

The Little Snowy Mountains are a small mountain range in central Montana about 25 miles (40 km) southeast of Lewistown. The range lies mostly in Fergus County, but the southern part of the range extends into Golden Valley and Musselshell counties.

The range is a lower continuation of the Big Snowy Mountains which lie immediately to the west. The small Pike Creek Hills are 12 miles (19 km) to the east.

The mountain pass between the Big and Little Snowies is at 6,018 feet (1,834 m) where Red Hill Road crosses the range. The pass elevation is considerably lower than the peaks of the Big Snowy range, but only about 200 feet (61 m) lower than the highest of the Little Snowy Range which are just northeast of the pass. Bold Butte, a named highpoint near the center of the range, has an elevation of 5,624 feet (1,714 m).

The South Fork Flatwillow Creek runs from the north side of the pass near Red Hill and east along the north side of the range. Willow Creek and various tributaries drain most of the range to the south and flows into the Musselshell River on to the southeast.

== Geology ==
Geologically the Little Snowy Mountains are a continuation of the Big Snowy Anticlinorium structure to the west and is entirely underlain by sedimentary rock. The area adjacent to the Big Snowy Mountains is underlain by Mississippian limestone and mudstone and the main part of the range is underlain by the Pennsylvanian Alaska Bench Formation limestone with Jurassic Piper Formation (mudstone, limestone and gypsum) along the north. The south flank is underlain by often steeply south dipping Jurassic through Cretaceous formations. An outcrop of Lower Cretaceous Kootenay Formation occurs along an anticline on Sahara Hill. Several thin, generally steeply dipping Upper Cretaceous formations occur along the southern margin of the range.

== See also ==
- List of mountain ranges in Montana
