= Boulder Hills (Montana) =

- Location within Montana

Highest point
- Elevation: 5,768 ft (1,758 m)
- Coordinates: 46°19′28″N 112°04′16″W

Geography
- Country: United States
- State: Montana

The Boulder Hills, el. 5,768 feet (1,758 m), is a set of foothills north of Boulder, Montana in Jefferson County, Montana.

== See also ==
- List of mountain ranges in Montana
