= Black Reef =

- Location within Montana

Highest point
- Elevation: 6,378 ft (1,944 m)
- Coordinates: 47°35′29″N 112°51′16″W

Geography
- Country: United States
- State: Montana

Black Reef, el. 6,378 feet (1,944 m), is a small mountain range west of Augusta, Montana in Lewis and Clark County, Montana.

== See also ==
- List of mountain ranges in Montana
