= The Wedge (Montana) =

- Location within Montana

Highest point
- Elevation: 10,548 ft (3,215 m)
- Coordinates: 45°01′47″N 111°30′47″W

Geography
- Country: United States
- State: Montana

The Wedge, el. 10,548 feet (3,215 m), is a small mountain range southeast of Cameron, Montana in Madison County, Montana. It is a sub-range of the Madison Range.

== See also ==
- List of mountain ranges in Montana
