= Canton, Montana =

Former town in Montana, United States

Coordinates: 46°24′50″N 111°30′12″W

Canton was a small town in Broadwater County, Montana, now submerged beneath Canyon Ferry Lake near Helena, Montana. The town was flooded when nearby Canyon Ferry Dam, originally built in 1898 to provide electricity for Helena, was replaced by a second, larger dam which began construction in 1949. When this was completed in 1953 the reservoir increased in volume by 50 times and eventually claimed 25 miles of river bottom, the town of Canton and 4,000 acres of farmland. The Canyon Ferry Dam is currently owned and operated by the Bureau of Reclamation.
