= Pike Creek Hills =

Range of hills in Montana, United States

- Location within Montana

Highest point
- Elevation: 4,032 ft (1,229 m)
- Listing: Mountain ranges of Montana
- Coordinates: 46°49′41″N 108°37′24″W

Dimensions
- Length: 3.2 mi (5.1 km) E-W
- Width: 1.5 mi (2.4 km) N-S

Geography
- Country: United States
- State: Montana
- Counties: Petroleum and Fergus
- Borders on: Little Snowy Mountains

The Pike Creek Hills, are a small range of hills 8.3 miles (13.4 km) west of the community of Flatwillow in Petroleum and Fergus counties in Montana. The highest elevation is an unnamed peak at 4,032 feet (1,229 m) with the stream valleys of Pike Creek to the north and Flatwillow Creek to the south at around 3,500 ft (1,100 m). The east end of the Little Snowy Mountains lie 12 miles (19 km) to the west.

== See also ==
- "Pike Creek Hills". Geographic Names Information System. United States Geological Survey, United States Department of the Interior.
