= Dickie Hills =

- Location within Montana

Highest point
- Elevation: 7,831 ft (2,387 m)
- Coordinates: 45°52′07″N 113°02′48″W

Geography
- Country: United States
- State: Montana

The Dickie Hills, el. 7,831 feet (2,387 m), is a small mountain range northwest of Wise River, Montana in Silver Bow County, Montana.

== See also ==
- List of mountain ranges in Montana
