= The Pine Hills =

Mountain range in Montana, US

- Location within Montana

Highest point
- Peak: Buck Mountain
- Elevation: 3,327 ft (1,014 m)
- Coordinates: 46°25′27″N 105°34′42″W

Geography
- Country: United States
- State: Montana

The Pine Hills, top elevation 3,327 feet (1,014 m) at Buck Mountain, are a small mountain range east of Miles City, Montana in Custer County, Montana. It is located along highway MT-12. The highway reaches a peak elevation of 3,140 feet (960 m) in the range. As the name implies, these lush pine-covered hills are known for their isolation, as the surrounding plains in all directions are treeless.

== Geography ==
Despite the Pine Hills reaching over 3,300 feet (1,000 meters) in elevation, the surrounding flat terrain ranges from between 2,300–2,500 feet (700–760 meters), making the range's prominence only 800–1,000 feet (240–300 metres). There are also several ranges of buttes in nearby areas, and some of these are of higher elevation than the Pine Hills, however these are not associated with the range.

== Ecology ==
The Pine Hills are mostly covered with lush sage and stands of Rocky Mountain ponderosa pine woodland. Many of these are relict stands from wetter times. The climate in this range is similar to the rest of Eastern Montana, hot, wet summers and cold, dry winters.

== Geology ==
As the Pine Hills are an old, worn-down mountain range, there are examples of old rock, such as at Strawberry Hill which has sandstone near its summit.

== Tourism ==
There is a single-cabin lodge located in the range named the Miles City Retreat at Rolf Ranch.

In addition, a primitive camping site is located in the Strawberry Hill Recreation Area, with no services.

== See also ==
- List of mountain ranges in Montana
