= Horn Mountains =

- Location within Montana

Highest point
- Elevation: 7,638 ft (2,328 m)
- Coordinates: 44°44′28″N 111°30′01″W

Geography
- Country: United States
- State: Montana

The Horn Mountains, el. 7,638 feet (2,328 m), is a small mountain range northwest of Henry's Lake, Idaho in Madison County, Montana.

== See also ==
- List of mountain ranges in Montana
