= Spear Hills =

- Location within Montana

Highest point
- Elevation: 3,694 ft (1,126 m)
- Coordinates: 45°00′55″N 105°53′46″W

Geography
- Country: United States
- State: Montana

The Spear Hills, el. 3,694 feet (1,126 m), is a set of hills south of Broadus, Montana in Powder River County, Montana.

== See also ==
- List of mountain ranges in Montana
