= Thoeny Hills =

Hills in Montana, United States

- Location within Montana Location within the United States

Highest point
- Elevation: 3,104 ft (946 m)
- Coordinates: 48°53′32″N 107°22′15″W

Geography
- Country: United States
- State: Montana

The Thoeny Hills, el. 3,104 feet (946 m), is a set of hills northeast of Malta, Montana in Phillips County.

== See also ==
- List of mountain ranges in Montana
