= Horseshoe Hills =

- Location within Montana

Highest point
- Elevation: 6,673 ft (2,034 m)
- Coordinates: 46°01′25″N 111°16′21″W

Geography
- Country: United States
- State: Montana

The Horseshoe Hills are a roughly crescent-shaped range of hills north of Manhattan, Montana in Gallatin County, Montana. They lie at 6,673 feet (2,034 m) in the area between the southern Big Belt Mountains and the northern Bridger Range. The hills are bounded on the north by Sixteen Mile Creek (which begins in the Crazy Mountains), the first major tributary of the Missouri River. As they are in the rain shadow of the Boulder, Elkhorn, and Bull Mountains to the west, the Horseshoe Hills are notably dry, receiving 10–12 inches (250–300 mm) of precipitation annually. This is especially true on the southern and southeastern flanks, which are also in the rain shadow of the hills themselves. In the driest areas, Missouri foxtail cacti, plains prickly pear cacti, and yucca abound, as well as prairie rattlesnakes. Much of the hills are private property, but there is also some state, BLM, and National Forest land.

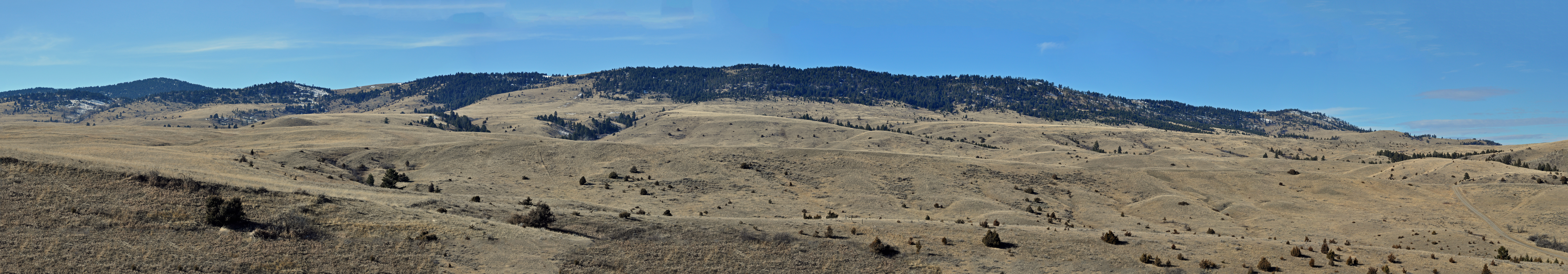
East face of Horseshoe Hills, Montana, from Dry Creek Rd south of Maudlow

== See also ==
- List of mountain ranges in Montana
