= Smoky Range =

Mountain range in Montana, United States

- Location within Montana

Highest point
- Elevation: 7,100 ft (2,200 m)
- Coordinates: 48°32′14″N 114°15′17″W

Geography
- Country: United States
- State: Montana

The Smoky Range, el. 7,100 feet (2,200 m), is a small mountain range northeast of Whitefish in Flathead County, Montana, United States.

== See also ==
- List of mountain ranges in Montana
