= Larb Hills =

- Location within Montana

Highest point
- Elevation: 2,549 ft (777 m)
- Coordinates: 48°20′45″N 107°23′02″W

Geography
- Country: United States
- State: Montana

The Larb Hills, el. 2,549 feet (777 m), is a set of hills southwest of Saco, Montana in Phillips County, Montana.

== See also ==
- List of mountain ranges in Montana
