= Dahl Hills =

- Location within Montana

Highest point
- Elevation: 3,245 ft (989 m)
- Coordinates: 48°46′59″N 106°34′51″W

Geography
- Country: United States
- State: Montana

The Dahl Hills, el. 3,245 feet (989 m), is a set of hills southwest of Opheim, Montana in Valley County, Montana.

== See also ==
- List of mountain ranges in Montana
