= Little Wolf Mountains =

- Location within Montana

Highest point
- Elevation: 4,800 ft (1,500 m)
- Coordinates: 45°50′33″N 106°54′39″W

Geography
- Country: United States
- State: Montana

The Little Wolf Mountains, el. 4,800 feet (1,500 m), is a small mountain range southwest of Colstrip, Montana in Big Horn County, Montana.

== See also ==
- List of mountain ranges in Montana
