= Big Sheep Mountains =

Mountain range in Montana, United States

Highest point
- Peak: Big Sheep Mountain
- Elevation: 3,600+ ft (1,100 m)
- Coordinates: 47°03′15″N 105°43′48″W

Geography
- Country: United States
- Region: Montana
- Range coordinates: 47°18′58″N 105°17′31″W

The Big Sheep Mountains are located in the eastern area of the U.S. State of Montana in Prairie County, Montana. They are the easternmost mountains in Montana. Nearby towns include Circle, Lindsay, and Glendive.

== See also ==
- List of mountain ranges in Montana
