= Cayuse =

Cayuse may refer to:

- Cayuse people, a people native to Oregon, United States
- Cayuse language, an extinct language of the Cayuse people
- Cayuse, Oregon, an unincorporated community in the United States
- Cayuse horse, an archaic term for a feral or low-quality horse or pony
- OH-6 "Cayuse", a military observation helicopter
- Cayuse Five, five Cayuse who were hanged for murder
- Cayuse Hills, mountain range in Montana
- Cayuse Pass, mountain pass in the Cascade Mountains in the state of Washington

== See also ==
- Cayoosh Flat is also the old name for the town of Lillooet, British Columbia
