= List of mountain ranges in Montana =

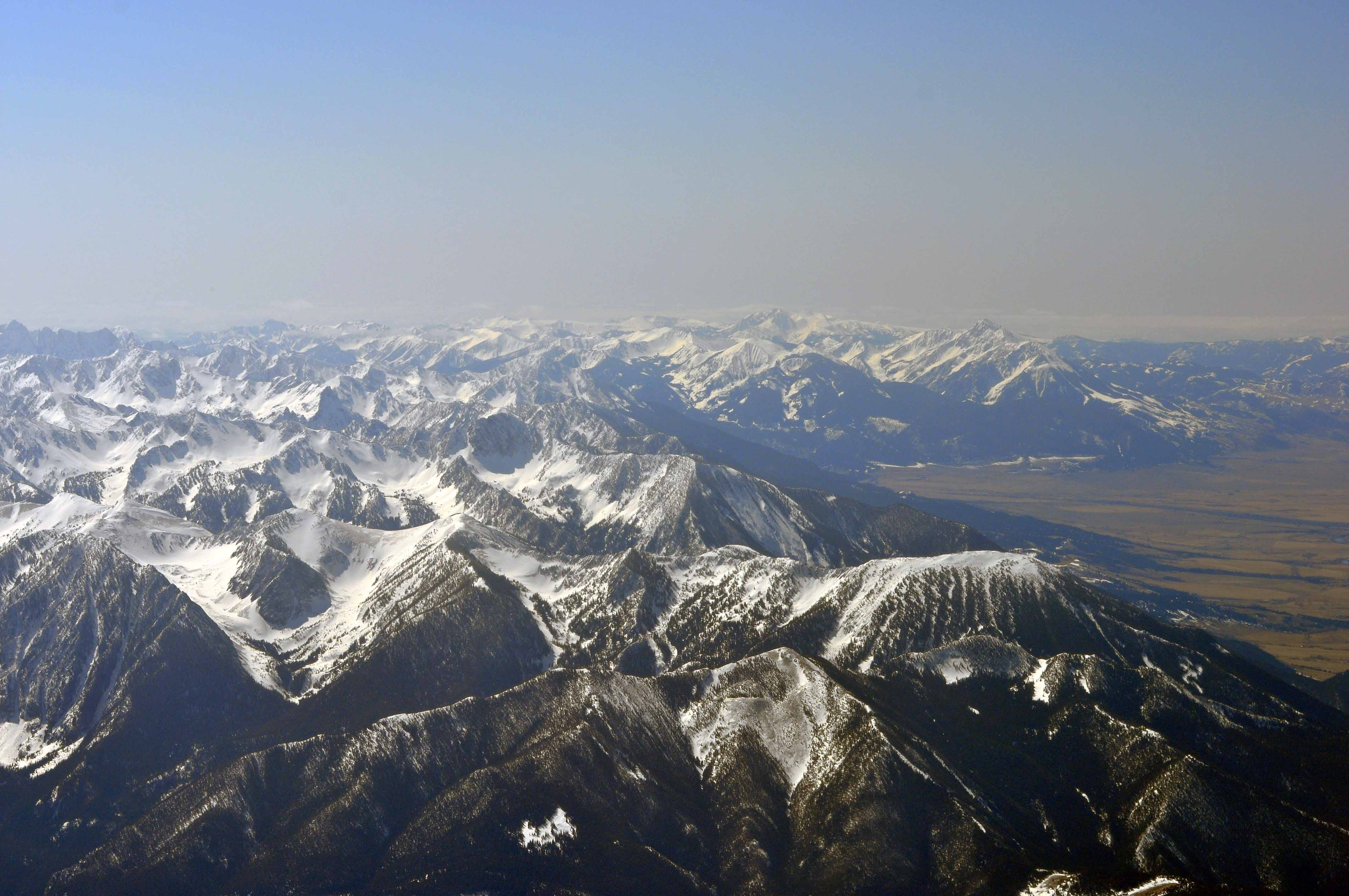
Northwest expanse of Absaroka Range

This is a list of mountain ranges in the state of Montana. Montana is the fourth largest state in the United States and is well known for its mountains. The name "Montana" is Spanish for "Mountain". Representative James Mitchell Ashley (R-Ohio), suggested the name when legislation organizing the territory was passed by the United States Congress in 1864. Ashley noted that a mining camp in the Colorado Territory had already used the name, and Congress agreed to use the name for the new territory.

According to the United States Board on Geographic Names, there are at least 100 named mountain ranges and sub-ranges in Montana. However, mountain ranges have no official boundaries, and there is no official list of mountain ranges in the state.

== List of mountain ranges ==
The mountain ranges below are listed by name, county, coordinates, and average elevation as recorded by the U.S. Geological Survey. Sub-ranges are indented below the name of the primary range. Some of these ranges extend into Wyoming, Idaho, and Canada.

- Absaroka Range; Park County, Montana; 43°57′40″N 109°20′21″W; 13,140 feet (4,010 m)
- Anaconda Range; Deer Lodge County, Montana; 45°58′52″N 113°26′32″W; 10,197 feet (3,108 m)
- Badger Hills; Big Horn County, Montana; 44°58′41″N 106°40′42″W; 4,655 feet (1,419 m)
- Bears Paw Mountains; Blaine & Hill County, Montana; 48°12′30″N 109°31′03″W; 4,623 feet (1,409 m)
- Beartooth Mountains; Park County, Montana; 45°09′48″N 109°48′29″W; 12,693 feet (3,869 m)
- Beaverhead Mountains; Lemhi County, Idaho; 44°21′17″N 112°49′21″W; 11,352 feet (3,460 m)
- Big Belt Mountains Broadwater County, Montana; 46°27′15″N 111°15′52″W; 7,385 feet (2,251 m)
- Big Horn Mountains; Big Horn County, Montana; 45°15′02″N 107°56′02″W; 4,734 feet (1,443 m)
- Big Sheep Mountains; Dawson County, Montana; 47°18′58″N 105°17′32″W; 2,900 feet (880 m)
- Big Snowy Mountains; Fergus County, Montana; 46°42′30″N 109°13′28″W; 6,673 feet (2,034 m)
- Bitterroot Range; Clearwater County, Idaho; 46°44′08″N 115°24′27″W; 7,126 feet (2,172 m)
  - Bitterroot Mountains; Mineral County, Montana; 47°06′09″N 115°09′33″W; 7,208 feet (2,197 m)
  - Grave Creek Range; Missoula County, Montana; 46°50′09″N 114°18′42″W; 6,135 feet (1,870 m)
- Black Reef; Lewis and Clark County, Montana; 47°35′29″N 112°51′16″W; 6,378 feet (1,944 m)
- Boulder Hills; Jefferson County, Montana; 46°19′28″N 112°04′16″W; 5,768 feet (1,758 m)
- Boulder Mountains; Deer Lodge County, Montana; 46°33′00″N 112°21′03″W; 6,096 feet (1,858 m)

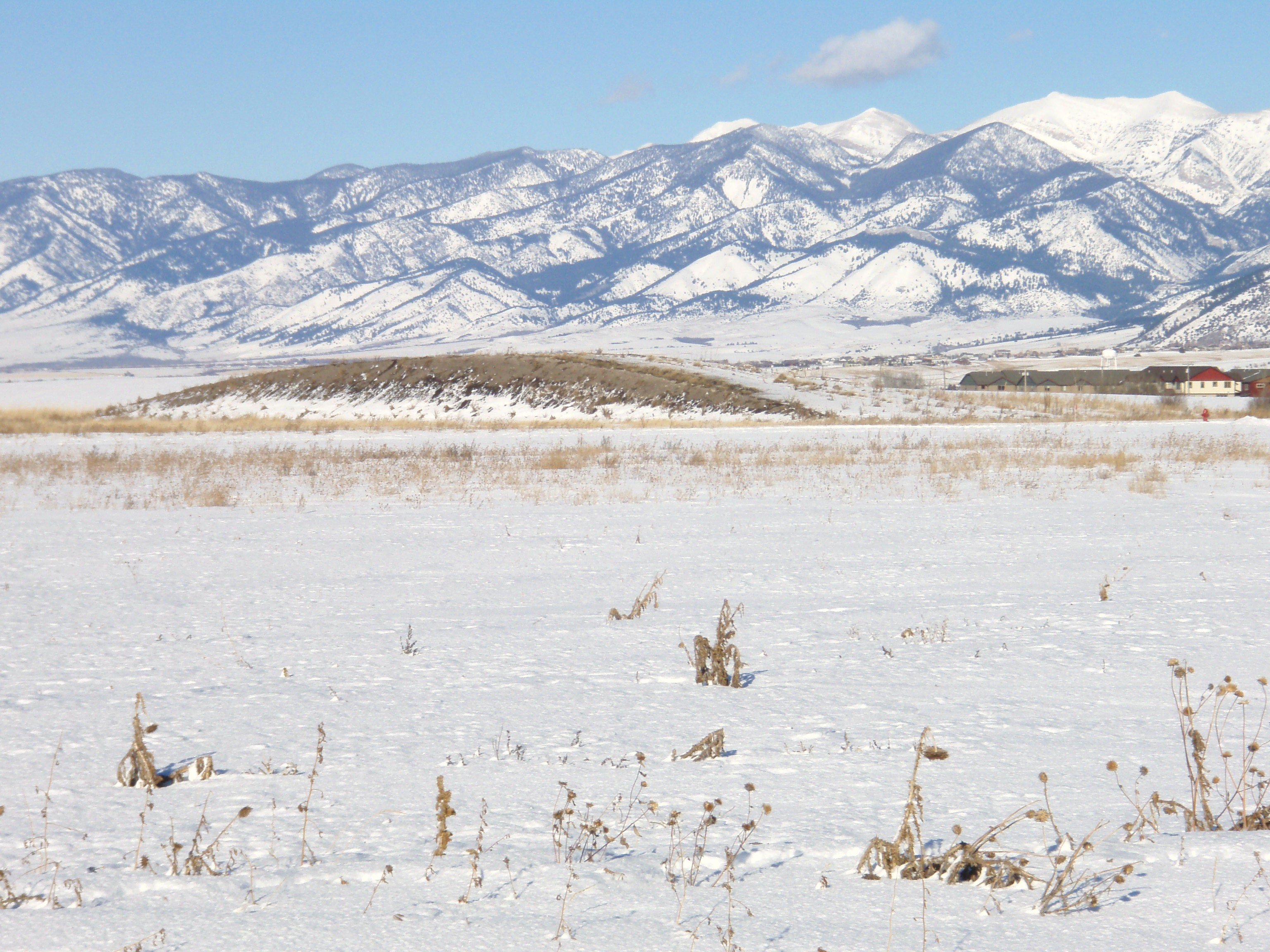
Bridger Range from Bozeman, Montana

- Bridger Range; Gallatin County, Montana; 45°53′19″N 110°57′30″W; 8,747 feet (2,666 m)
- Bull Mountains; Musselshell County, Montana; 46°20′00″N 108°15′03″W; 3,845 feet (1,172 m)
- Butcher Hills; Carter County, Montana; 45°10′32″N 104°21′59″W; 3,553 feet (1,083 m)
- Cabinet Mountains; Sanders County, Montana; 48°10′00″N 115°50′04″W; 4,058 feet (1,237 m)
- Calderwood Hills; Valley County, Montana; 48°27′48″N 106°23′52″W; 2,799 feet (853 m)
- Castle Mountains; Meagher County, Montana; 46°28′11″N 110°45′54″W; 8,117 feet (2,474 m)
- Cayuse Hills; Sweet Grass County, Montana; 46°04′44″N 109°42′00″W; 5,079 feet (1,548 m)
- Centennial Mountains; Clark County, Idaho; 44°33′44″N 111°30′17″W; 10,177 feet (3,102 m)
  - Eastern Centennial Mountains; Clark County, Idaho; 44°33′44″N 111°30′17″W; 10,180 feet (3,100 m)
  - Western Centennial Mountains; Clark County, Idaho; 44°33′05″N 111°52′15″W; 9,390 feet (2,860 m)
- Chalk Buttes; Carter County, Montana; 45°44′03″N 104°41′11″W; 4,134 feet (1,260 m)

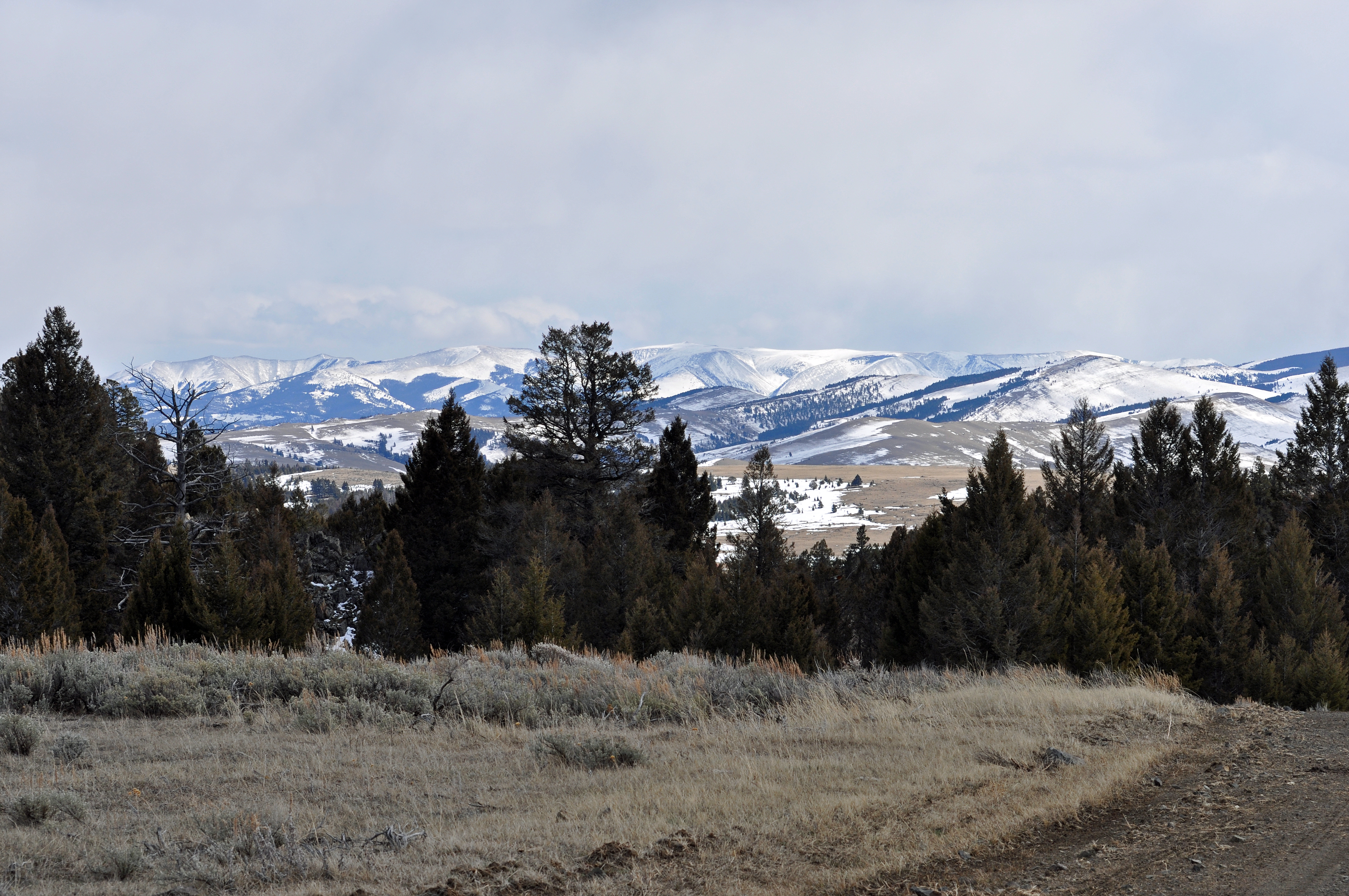
Northern expanse of Crazy Mountains as seen from Castle Mountain foothills.

- Coeur d'Alene Mountains; Sanders County, Montana; 47°45′00″N 116°00′04″W; 3,497 feet (1,066 m)
- Crazy Mountains; Park County, Montana; 46°10′00″N 110°30′03″W; 11,214 feet (3,418 m)
- Dahl Hills; Valley County, Montana; 48°46′59″N 106°34′51″W; 3,245 feet (989 m)
- Dickie Hills; Silver Bow County, Montana; 45°52′07″N 113°02′48″W; 7,831 feet (2,387 m)
- Dry Range; Meagher County, Montana; 46°48′00″N 111°17′03″W; 6,152 feet (1,875 m)
- Ekalaka Hills; Carter County, Montana; 45°52′36″N 104°28′18″W; 3,720 feet (1,130 m)
- Elkhorn Mountains; Jefferson County, Montana; 46°28′50″N 111°52′34″W; 4,944 feet (1,507 m)
- Flathead Alps; Powell County, Montana; 47°30′40″N 113°09′24″W; 8,337 feet (2,541 m)
- Flathead Range; Flathead County, Montana; 48°16′00″N 113°44′03″W; 6,102 feet (1,860 m)
- Flattops; Carter County, Montana; 45°19′00″N 104°41′23″W; 3,835 feet (1,169 m)
- Flint Creek Range; Granite County, Montana; 46°22′00″N 113°06′33″W; 6,542 feet (1,994 m)
- Franklin Hills; Sweet Grass County, Montana; 46°03′13″N 109°53′27″W; 4,879 feet (1,487 m)
- Gallatin Range; Gallatin County, Montana; 45°18′49″N 111°04′44″W; 9,737 feet (2,968 m)
- Gallatin Range; Park County, Wyoming; 44°55′00″N 110°53′03″W; 9,003 feet (2,744 m)
- Garnet Range; Powell County, Montana; 46°43′18″N 112°57′33″W; 6,014 feet (1,833 m)
- Granite Range; Stillwater County, Montana; 45°15′36″N 109°49′49″W; 11,092 feet (3,381 m)
- Gravelly Range; Madison County, Montana; 45°05′21″N 111°51′25″W; 8,258 feet (2,517 m)
- Greenhorn Range; Madison County, Montana; 45°06′32″N 111°58′05″W; 8,622 feet (2,628 m)
- Henrys Lake Mountains; Madison County, Montana; 44°46′52″N 111°24′00″W; 10,148 feet (3,093 m)
- Highland Mountains; Madison County, Montana; 45°43′34″N 112°28′44″W; 9,081 feet (2,768 m)
- Highwood Mountains Chouteau County, Montana; 47°27′47″N 110°33′39″W; 5,148 feet (1,569 m)
- Honeycomb Hills; Powder River County, Montana; 45°36′07″N 105°00′21″W; 3,094 feet (943 m)
- Horn Mountains; Madison County, Montana; 44°44′28″N 111°30′01″W; 7,638 feet (2,328 m)
- Horseshoe Hills; Gallatin County, Montana; 46°01′25″N 111°16′21″W; 6,673 feet (2,034 m)
- Humbolt Hills; Carter County, Montana; 45°49′29″N 104°06′24″W; 3,314 feet (1,010 m)
- John Long Mountains; Granite County, Montana; 46°26′16″N 113°26′52″W; 7,923 feet (2,415 m)

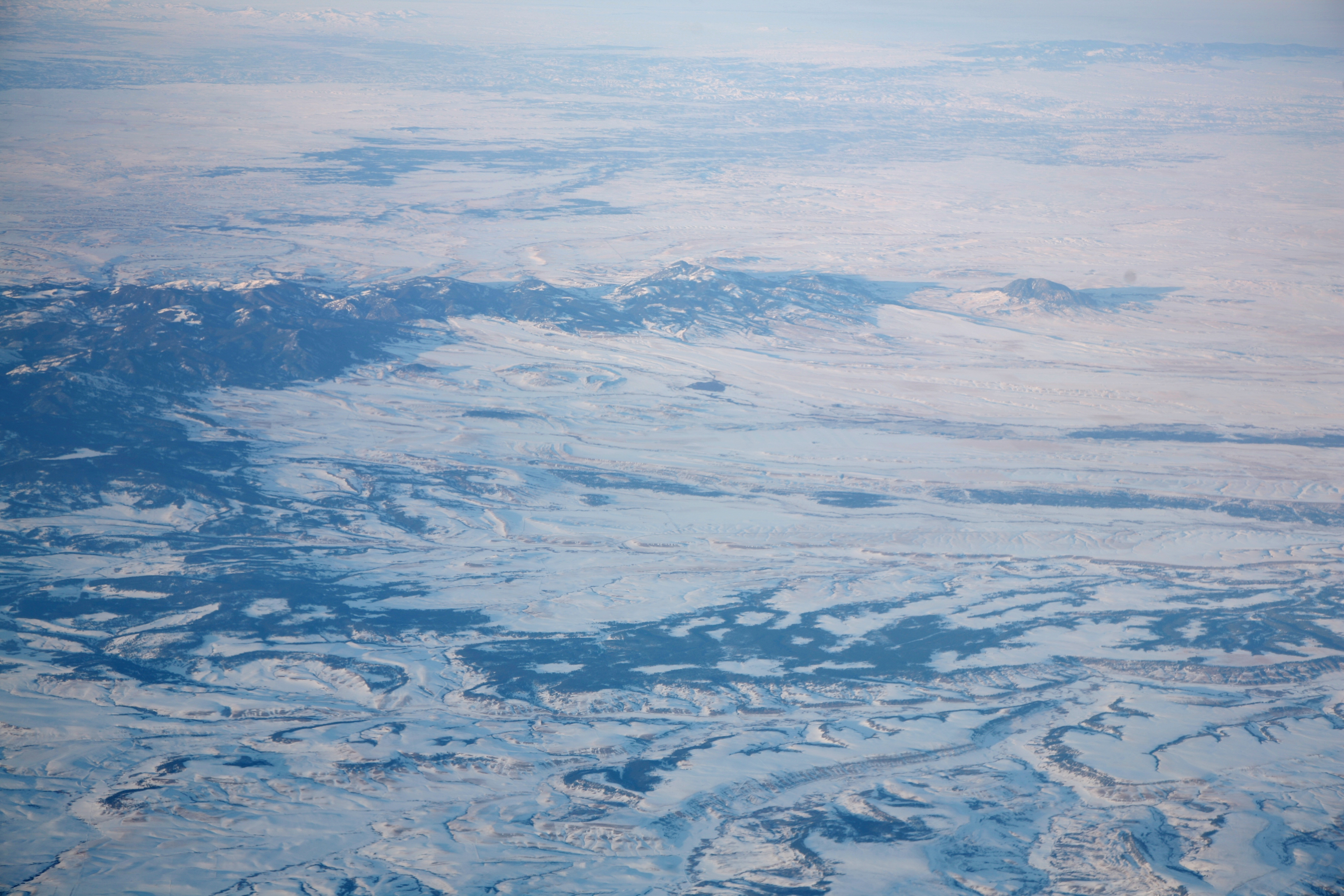
Judith Mountains in winter

- Judith Mountains; Fergus County, Montana; 47°13′08″N 109°13′43″W; 6,017 feet (1,834 m)
- Larb Hills; Phillips County, Montana; 48°20′45″N 107°23′02″W; 2,549 feet (777 m)
- Lewis Range; Glacier County, Montana; 48°53′00″N 113°51′03″W; 8,172 feet (2,491 m)
- Lewis and Clark Range; Powell County, Montana; 47°30′01″N 113°08′03″W; 7,109 feet (2,167 m)
- Limestone Hills; Broadwater County, Montana; 46°14′59″N 111°37′34″W; 4,977 feet (1,517 m)
- Little Belt Mountains; Meagher County, Montana; 46°50′17″N 110°43′06″W; 8,195 feet (2,498 m)
- Little Rocky Mountains; Blaine County, Montana; 48°00′34″N 108°36′07″W; 4,531 feet (1,381 m)
- Little Snowy Mountains; Fergus County, Montana; 46°45′27″N 109°09′36″W; 5,978 feet (1,822 m)
- Little Wolf Mountains; Big Horn County, Montana; 45°50′33″N 106°54′39″W; 4,800 feet (1,500 m)
- Livingston Range; Glacier County, Montana; 48°57′47″N 114°01′26″W; 9,321 feet (2,841 m)
- Long Pines; Carter County, Montana; 45°41′20″N 104°13′42″W; 4,094 feet (1,248 m)
- Madison Range; Madison County, Montana; 45°15′00″N 111°30′03″W; 9,308 feet (2,837 m)
  - Spanish Peaks; Madison County, Montana; 45°23′13″N 111°25′39″W; 8,441 feet (2,573 m)
  - The Wedge; Madison County, Montana; 45°01′47″N 111°30′47″W; 10,548 feet (3,215 m)
- Milk River Hills; McCone County, Montana; 48°01′43″N 106°18′07″W; 2,644 feet (806 m)
- Mission Range; Lake County, Montana; 47°48′40″N 113°55′30″W; 6,063 feet (1,848 m)
- North Hills; Missoula County, Montana; 46°54′50″N 114°00′23″W; 3,556 feet (1,084 m)
- North Moccasin Mountains; Fergus County, Montana; 47°17′47″N 109°29′06″W; 5,384 feet (1,641 m)
- Opheim Hills; Valley County, Montana; 48°52′55″N 106°30′45″W; 3,304 feet (1,007 m)
- Papoose Hills; Valley County, Montana; 48°39′30″N 107°05′23″W; 2,815 feet (858 m)
- Park Hills; Meagher County, Montana; 46°36′46″N 110°55′19″W; 6,260 feet (1,910 m)
- Pike Creek Hills; Petroleum County, Montana; 46°50′06″N 108°36′39″W; 3,707 feet (1,130 m)
- Piney Buttes; Garfield County, Montana; 47°27′30″N 106°47′02″W; 2,651 feet (808 m)
- Pioneer Mountains; Beaverhead County, Montana; 45°29′55″N 112°58′25″W; 10,065 feet (3,068 m)
- Pryor Mountains Big Horn County, Montana and Carbon County, Montana; 45°15′00″N 108°30′02″W; 6,417 feet (1,956 m)
- Purcell Mountains; Lincoln County, Montana; 48°57′48″N 115°58′06″W; 7,707 feet (2,349 m)
- Rattlesnake Mountains (Montana); Lake County, Montana and Missoula County, Montana; 47°05′42″N 113°55′22″W; 8,620 feet (2,630 m)
- Rocky Hills; Beaverhead County, Montana; 45°04′13″N 112°58′44″W; 6,916 feet (2,108 m)
- Ruby Range; Madison County, Montana; 45°17′03″N 112°14′04″W; 8,727 feet (2,660 m)
- Salish Mountains; Lincoln County, Montana; 48°16′00″N 114°44′04″W; 5,049 feet (1,539 m)
- Sapphire Mountains Ravalli County, Montana; 46°15′00″N 113°45′03″W; 7,582 feet (2,311 m)
- Sawtooth Range; Teton County, Montana; 47°48′00″N 112°47′37″W; 7,877 feet (2,401 m)
- Smoky Range; Flathead County, Montana; 48°32′14″N 114°15′17″W; 7,100 feet (2,200 m)
- Snowcrest Range; Madison County, Montana; 44°50′34″N 112°05′41″W; 9,846 feet (3,001 m)
- South Hills; Missoula County, Montana; 46°49′30″N 114°00′53″W; 3,592 feet (1,095 m)
- South Moccasin Mountains; Fergus County, Montana; 47°10′21″N 109°31′26″W; 4,951 feet (1,509 m)
- Spear Hills; Powder River County, Montana; 45°00′55″N 105°52′46″W; 3,694 feet (1,126 m)
- Spokane Hills; Lewis and Clark County, Montana; 46°37′02″N 111°46′14″W; 4,058 feet (1,237 m)
- Swan Range; Flathead County, Montana; 47°43′30″N 113°37′35″W; 7,385 feet (2,251 m)
- Sweet Grass Hills; Liberty County, Montana and Toole County, Montana; 48°50′50″N 111°22′31″W; 6,309 feet (1,923 m)
- Taylor Hills; Carter County, Montana; 45°39′17″N 104°27′47″W; 3,474 feet (1,059 m)
- Tendoy Mountains; Beaverhead County, Montana; 44°44′37″N 112°48′26″W; 7,854 feet (2,394 m)
- The Pine Hills; Custer County, Montana; 46°25′27″N 105°34′42″W; 3,202 feet (976 m)
- The Pinnacles; Cascade County, Montana; 47°02′53″N 111°38′35″W; 6,545 feet (1,995 m)
- Thoeny Hills; Phillips County, Montana; 48°53′32″N 107°22′15″W; 3,104 feet (946 m)
- Three Buttes; Blaine County, Montana; 48°10′34″N 108°45′00″W; 3,848 feet (1,173 m)
- Tobacco Root Mountains Madison County, Montana; 45°33′16″N 111°58′28″W; 7,497 feet (2,285 m)
- Whitefish Range; Flathead County, Montana; 48°37′59″N 114°29′43″W; 6,982 feet (2,128 m)
- Wilson Range; Glacier County, Montana; 48°59′00″N 113°50′03″W; 7,119 feet (2,170 m)
- Wolf Mountains; Big Horn County, Montana; 45°11′46″N 107°08′27″W; 4,842 feet (1,476 m)

== See also ==
- Mountains and mountain ranges of Glacier National Park (U.S.)
- Mountains and mountain ranges of Yellowstone National Park
- List of mountains in Montana
- Mountain passes in Montana (A-L)
- Mountain passes in Montana (M-Z)
