= South Hills (Montana) =

Range of foothills in Montana, United States

- Location within Montana

Highest point
- Elevation: 3,592 ft (1,095 m)
- Coordinates: 46°49′30″N 114°00′53″W

Geography
- Country: United States
- State: Montana

The South Hills are the small foothills in various Montana communities, most notably those at elevation 3,592 feet (1,095 m), south of Missoula, Montana in Missoula County. Several districts of Missoula are also in the South Hills, such as Whitaker Heights/Farviews Neighborhood, Hillview Heights/South Hills Neighborhood, and Miller Creek-Linda Vista.

== See also ==
- List of mountain ranges in Montana
