= Park Hills (Montana) =

Mountain range in Montana, United States

- Location within Montana

Highest point
- Elevation: 6,260 ft (1,910 m)
- Coordinates: 46°36′46″N 110°55′19″W

Geography
- Country: United States
- State: Montana

The Park Hills, el. 6,260 feet (1,910 m), is a sub-range of the Little Belt Mountains northwest of White Sulphur Springs, Montana in Meagher County, Montana.

== See also ==
- List of mountain ranges in Montana
