= Butcher Hill Historic District =

Historic district in West Virginia, United States

- U.S. National Register of Historic Places
- U.S. Historic district
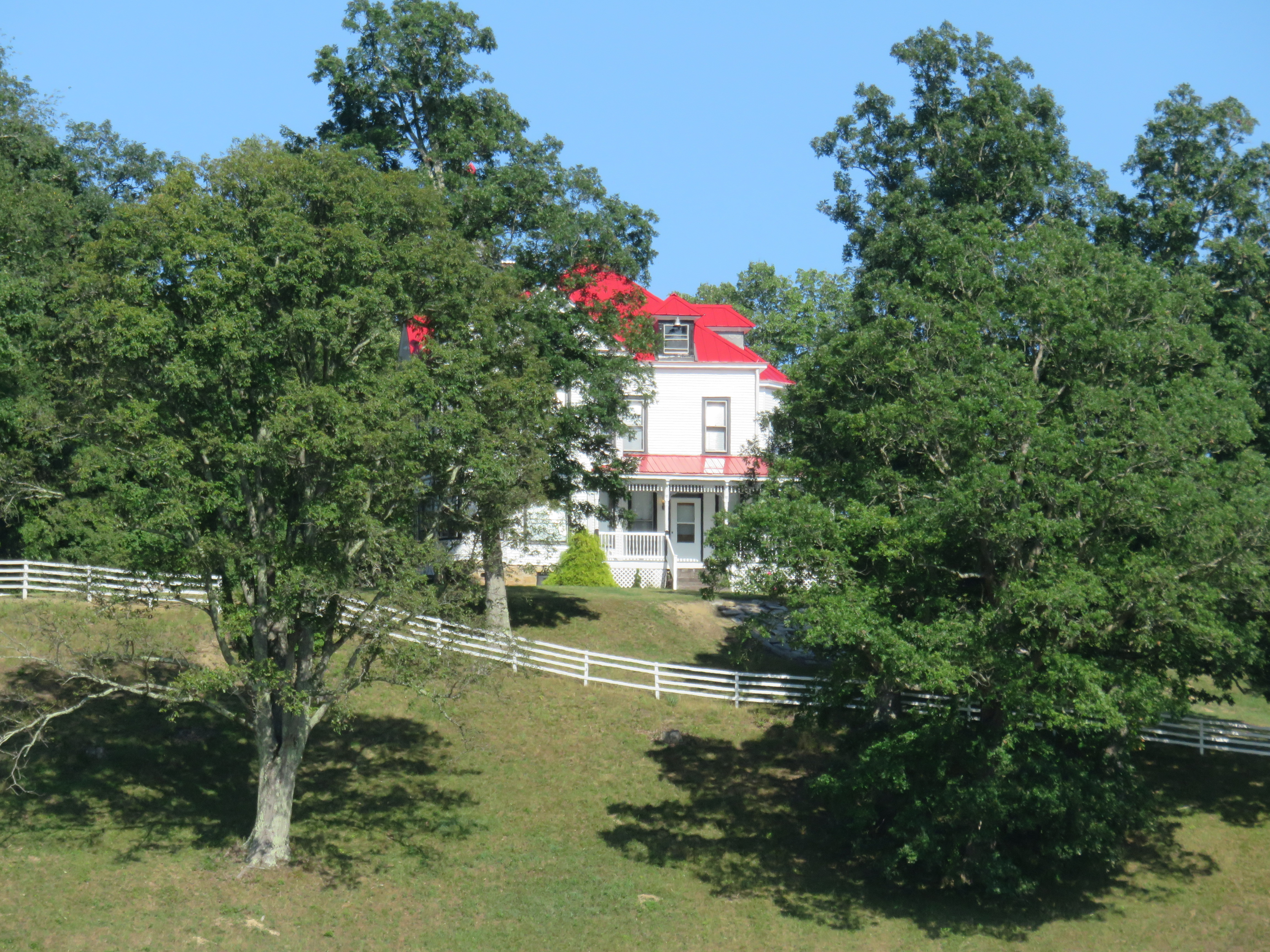
- Butcher Hill Historic District in 2021

- Location within West Virginia Location within the United States
- Location: East of Beverly, near Beverly, West Virginia
- Coordinates: 38.8433°N 79.8685°W
- Area: 9 acres (3.6 ha)
- Built: 1861
- Architectural style: Queen Anne
- NRHP reference No.: 89001784
- Added to NRHP: November 9, 1989

Butcher Hill Historic District is a national historic district located near Beverly, Randolph County, West Virginia. It encompasses one contributing building, one contributing site, and one contributing structure. It consists of the "Butcher Hill" home, a V-shaped trench from the American Civil War in front of the house at the edge of a drop, and the Butcher Cemetery. The house is a two-story frame dwelling, with a hipped roof and rounded turrets in the Queen Anne style. The property was the site of a major Federal encampment, entrenchment and artillery placement during the Civil War.

It was listed on the National Register of Historic Places in 1989.
