= Flattops (Montana) =

The Flattops
- Location within Montana

Highest point
- Elevation: 3,835 ft (1,169 m)
- Coordinates: 45°19′00″N 104°41′23″W

Geography
- Country: United States
- State: Montana

The Flattops, el. 3,835 feet (1,169 m), is a small set of hills northeast of Hammond in Carter County, Montana, United States.

== See also ==
- List of mountain ranges in Montana
