= Butcher Hill (West Virginia) =

Hill in West Virginia, U.S.

Coordinates: 39.1709103°N 81.4695657°W

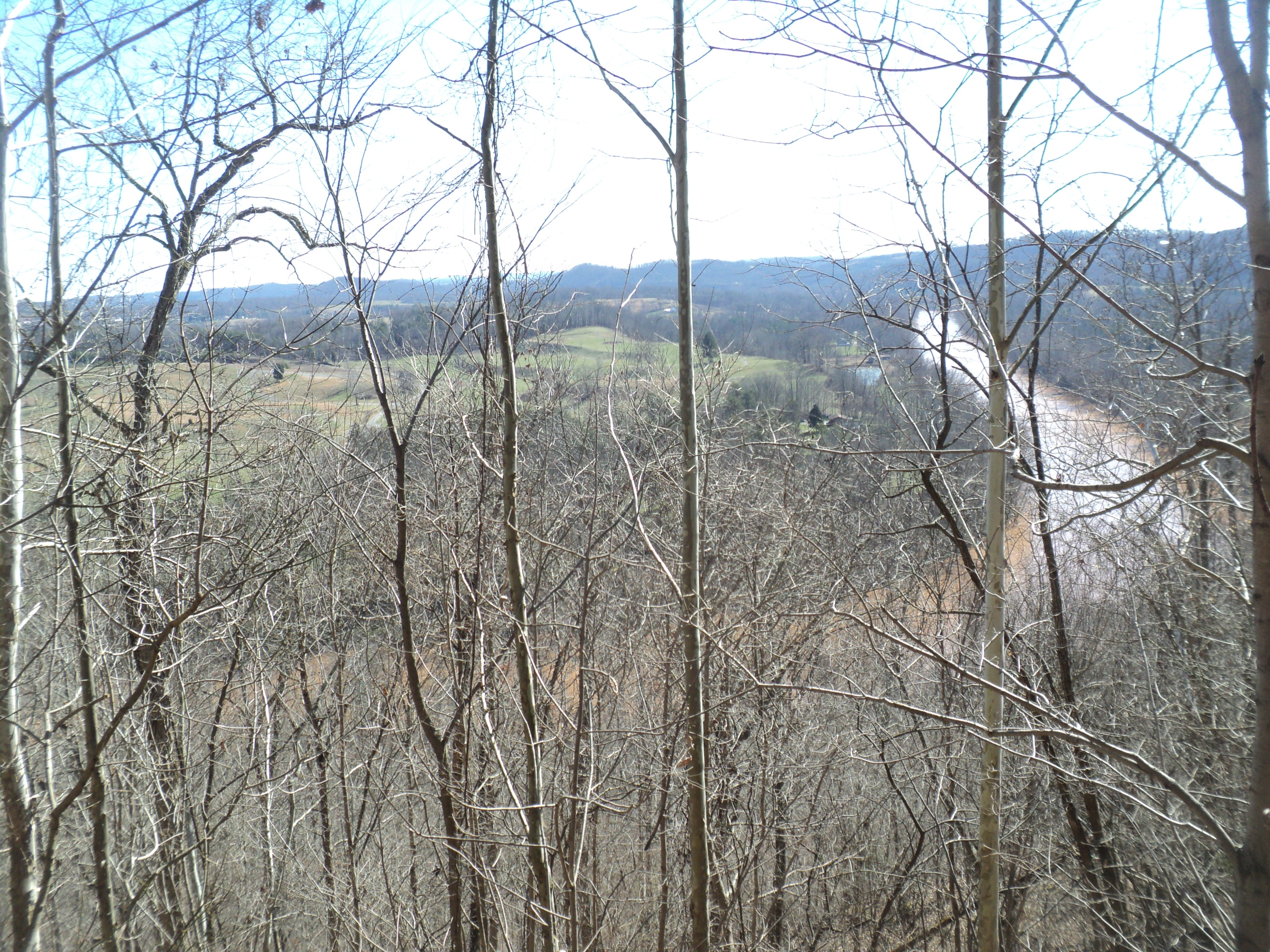
Panorama from summit of Butcher Hill

Butcher Hill is a summit in Wood County, West Virginia, in the United States. With an elevation of 912 feet (278 m), Butcher Hill is the 932nd highest summit in the state of West Virginia.

The hill has the name of the local Butcher family of pioneer settlers.
