= Canyon Ferry Lake =

Reservoir in Montana, United States

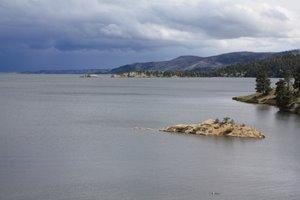
- Canyon Ferry Lake

- Location within Montana Location within the United States
- Location: Lewis and Clark and Broadwater Counties in Montana, United States. Located near Helena, Montana.
- Coordinates: 46°28′53″N 111°32′47″W
- Type: reservoir
- Primary inflows: Missouri River
- Primary outflows: Missouri River
- Catchment area: 15,904 sq mi (41,190 km^{2})
- Basin countries: United States
- Max. length: 30 mi (48 km)
- Max. width: 5 mi (8.0 km)
- Surface area: 33,534 acres (13,571 ha)
- Max. depth: 166 ft (51 m)
- Water volume: 1,550,596 acre⋅ft (1.912632 km^{3})
- Shore length^{1}: 76 mi (122 km)
- Surface elevation: 3,799 ft (1,158 m) msl
- Islands: Cemetery Island
- Settlements: Canton and Townsend
- ^{1} Shore length is not a well-defined measure.

Canyon Ferry Lake is a reservoir on the Missouri River 20 miles east of Helena, Montana near Townsend, Montana. It is Montana's third largest body of water, covers 33,534 acres (13,571 ha) and has 76 miles (122 km) of shore. It was formed by the building of Canyon Ferry Dam, which was completed in 1954 and has been used for electricity, irrigation, and flood control since.

== Recreation ==
The lake is a popular outdoor destination providing boating, fishing, wildlife habitat, and is nestled against the Big Belt Mountains of the Rocky Mountains. It is considered one of the most popular lakes in the state, with 24 recreation sites around the reservoir. Canyon Ferry Lake has also become a leading ice boat venue for iceboat racing and iceboat world speed record attempts. The former town of Canton lies beneath the lake, having been submerged following construction of the dam.

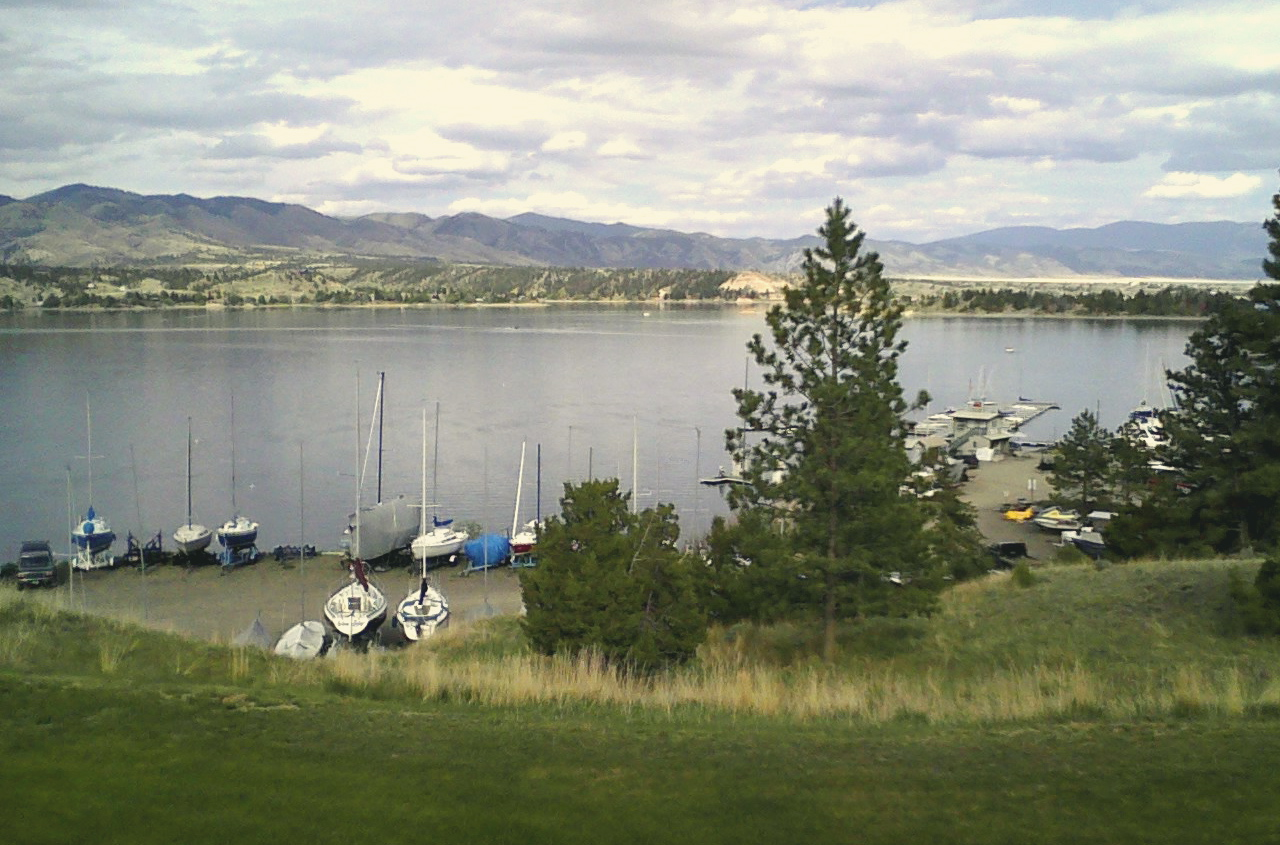
Canyon Ferry Lake, north end, viewed from Yacht Basin Marina.

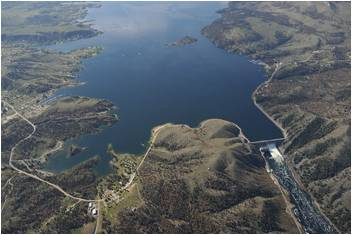
Aerial View of Canyon Ferry Lake and Canyon Ferry Dam.

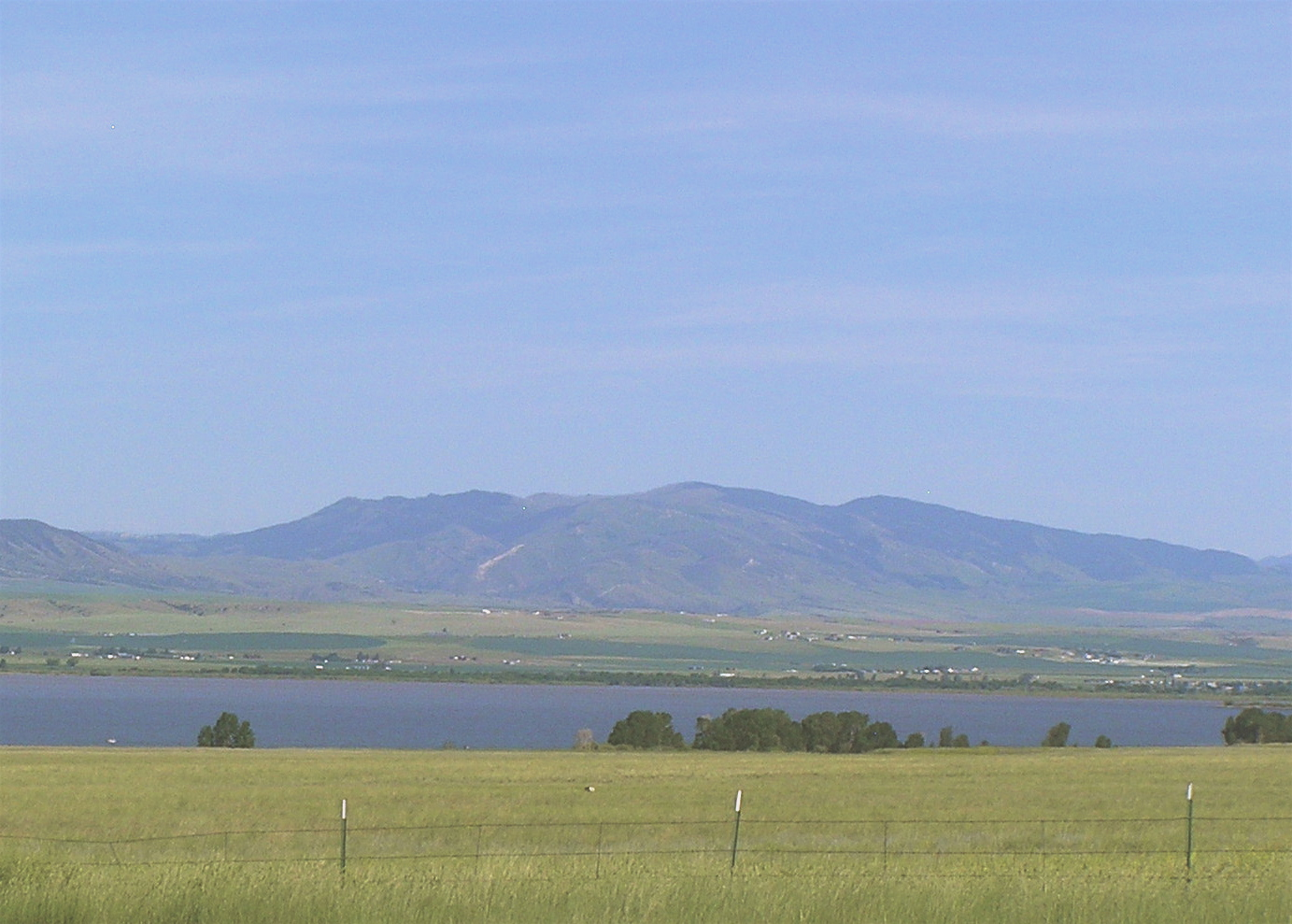
Canyon Ferry Lake in foreground as seen from U.S. Highway 12 near Townsend, Montana. Big Belt Mountains in background.

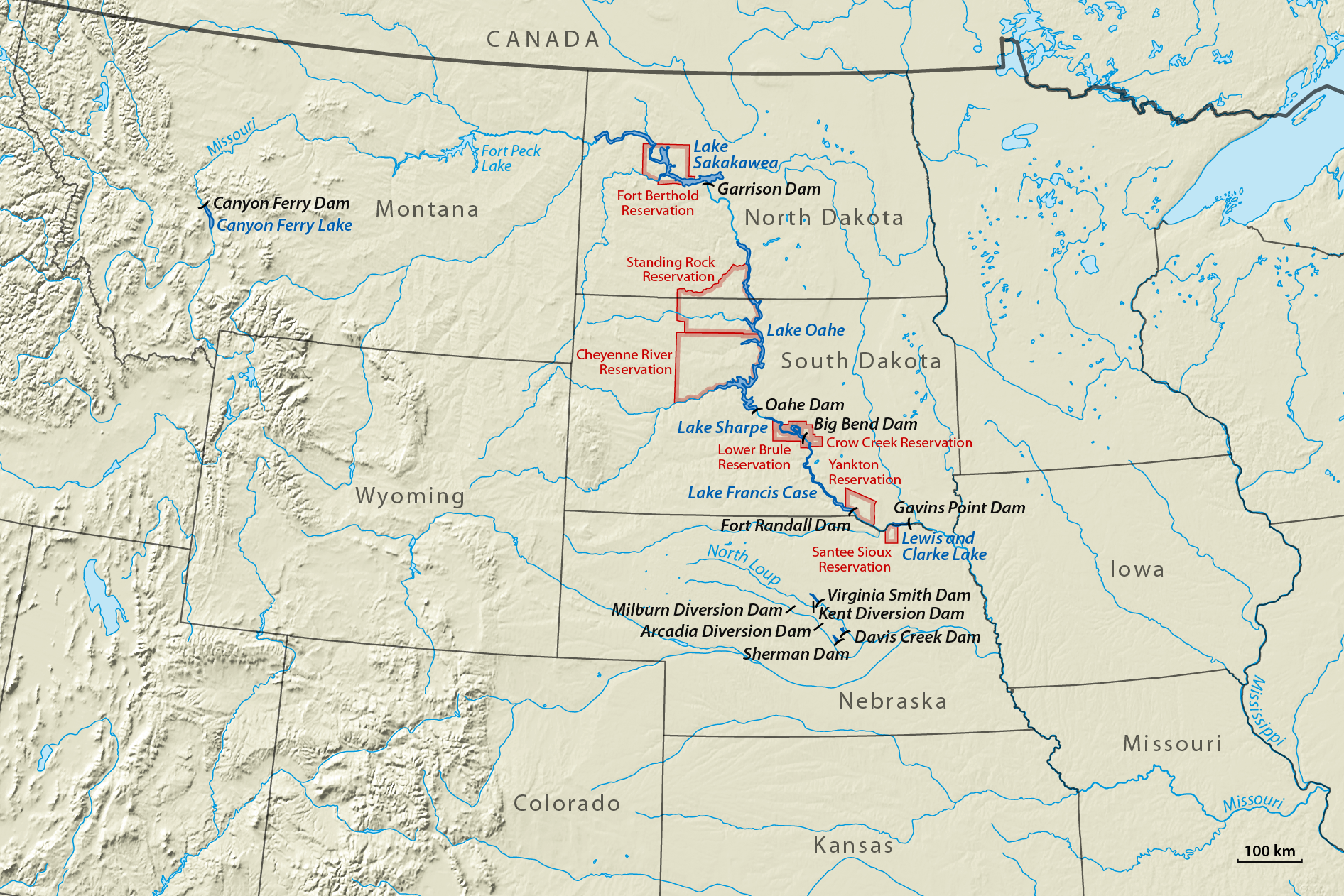
Location of Canyon Ferry Lake and other reservoirs and dams built in the Pick–Sloan Program since the 1940s.

== Fishing ==
The lake is regularly stocked with fish. Canyon Ferry Reservoir continues to be one of the most popular angling destinations in the state of Montana.

Fish species within the lake
Species	Family	Class	Native to MT
Bluegill	Sunfish	Warmwater	Introduced
Brook Trout	Trout	Coldwater	Introduced
Brown Trout	Trout	Coldwater	Introduced
Burbot	Codfish	Coldwater	Native
Common Carp	Minnow	Warmwater	Introduced
Fathead Minnow	Minnow	Warmwater	Native
Flathead Chub	Minnow	Warmwater	Native
Largemouth Bass	Sunfish	Warmwater	Introduced
Longnose Dace	Minnow	Warmwater	Native
Longnose Sucker	Sucker	Warmwater	Native
Mottled Sculpin	Sculpin		Native
Mountain Whitefish	Trout	Coldwater	Native
Northern Pike	Pike	Warmwater	Introduced
Pumpkinseed	Sunfish	Warmwater	Introduced
Rainbow Trout	Trout	Coldwater	Introduced
Smallmouth Bass	Sunfish	Warmwater	Introduced
Stonecat	Catfish		Native
Utah Chub	Minnow		Introduced
Walleye	Perch	Warmwater	Introduced
White Sucker	Sucker	Warmwater	Native
Yellow Perch	Perch	Warmwater	Introduced
Yellowstone Cutthroat Trout	Trout	Coldwater	Native

== See also ==
- List of lakes in Montana
- List of dams in the Missouri River watershed
