= Franklin Hills (Montana) =

- Location within Montana

Highest point
- Elevation: 4,879 ft (1,487 m)
- Coordinates: 46°03′13″N 109°53′27″W

Geography
- Country: United States
- State: Montana

The Franklin Hills, el. 4,879 feet (1,487 m), is a set of hills southeast of Melville, Montana in Sweet Grass County, Montana.

== See also ==
- List of mountain ranges in Montana
