= Opheim (surname) =

Opheim is a surname. Notable people with the surname include:

- Alf Opheim (1920–2006), Norwegian alpine skier
- Aliette Opheim (born 1985), Swedish actress
- Berit Opheim (born 1967), Norwegian singer
- Kåre Opheim (born 1975), Norwegian musician
- Torfinn Opheim (born 1961), Norwegian politician
