= Badger Hills =

Set of hills in Montana, USA

Highest point
- Elevation: 4,655 ft (1,419 m)
- Coordinates: 44°58′41″N 106°40′42″W

Geography
- Country: United States
- State: Montana

The Badger Hills el. 4,655 feet (1,419 m), is a set of hills in Big Horn County, Montana.

== See also ==
- List of mountain ranges in Montana
