= Cayuse Hills =

Mountain range in Montana

- Location within Montana

Highest point
- Elevation: 5,079 ft (1,548 m)
- Coordinates: 46°04′44″N 109°42′00″W

Geography
- Country: United States
- State: Montana

The Cayuse Hills, el. 5,079 feet (1,548 m), is a small mountain range northeast of Big Timber, Montana in Sweet Grass County, Montana.

== See also ==
- List of mountain ranges in Montana
