= Opheim Hills =

- Location within Montana

Highest point
- Elevation: 3,304 ft (1,007 m)
- Coordinates: 48°52′55″N 106°30′45″W

Geography
- Country: United States
- State: Montana

The Opheim Hills, el. 3,304 feet (1,007 m), is a set of hills northwest of Opheim, Montana in Valley County, Montana, United States.

== See also ==
- List of mountain ranges in Montana
