= Butcher Hills =

Hills near Ekalaka, Montana

- Location within Montana

Highest point
- Elevation: 3,553 ft (1,083 m)
- Coordinates: 45°10′32″N 104°21′59″W

Geography
- Country: United States
- State: Montana

The Butcher Hills, elevation 3,553 feet (1,083 m), is a set of hills near Ekalaka, Montana in Carter County, Montana.

== See also ==
- List of mountain ranges in Montana
