= Boulder Mountains (Montana) =

Mountain range in Montana, United States

Highest point
- Peak: Haystack Mountain
- Elevation: 8,819 ft (2,688 m)
- Coordinates: 46°08′29″N 112°19′35″W

Geography
- Country: United States
- State: Montana
- Parent range: Rocky Mountains

The Boulder Mountains are a mountain range running roughly north to south located west of Boulder between Helena and Butte in the U.S. state of Montana. Parts of the range are in four different counties: Deer Lodge, Jefferson, Lewis and Clark, and Silver Bow.

Haystack Mountain, which reaches 8,819 feet (2,688 m), is the tallest peak in the range. The three other highest peaks are Jack Mountain at 8,752 feet (2,668 m), Bull Mountain at 8,609 feet (2,624 m), and Thunderbolt Mountain at 8,597 feet (2,620 m). All four peaks are in Jefferson County.

== Climate ==
Rocker Peak, 8,455 ft (2,577 m), is near Jack Mountain (Montana), the second highest peak in the Boulder Mountains. There is a SNOTEL weather station near the summit of Rocker Peak at an elevation of 8,000 ft (2,438 m). Rocker Peak has a subalpine climate (Köppen Dfc), bordering on an alpine climate (Köppen ETH).

Climate data for Rocker Peak, Montana (elevation 8,000 feet or 2,438 meters): 1991–2020 normals; 1983–2020 extremes
Month	Jan	Feb	Mar	Apr	May	Jun	Jul	Aug	Sep	Oct	Nov	Dec	Year
Record high °F (°C)	55 (13)	53 (12)	58 (14)	66 (19)	73 (23)	81 (27)	85 (29)	85 (29)	81 (27)	72 (22)	59 (15)	48 (9)	85 (29)
Mean maximum °F (°C)	43.2 (6.2)	43.4 (6.3)	49.6 (9.8)	56.5 (13.6)	63.8 (17.7)	71.4 (21.9)	77.1 (25.1)	76.2 (24.6)	72.1 (22.3)	62.1 (16.7)	49.0 (9.4)	40.7 (4.8)	78.2 (25.7)
Mean daily maximum °F (°C)	26.8 (−2.9)	27.6 (−2.4)	34.2 (1.2)	39.6 (4.2)	48.0 (8.9)	55.8 (13.2)	66.4 (19.1)	65.4 (18.6)	55.8 (13.2)	42.4 (5.8)	31.6 (−0.2)	25.1 (−3.8)	43.2 (6.2)
Daily mean °F (°C)	20.2 (−6.6)	19.8 (−6.8)	25.5 (−3.6)	30.5 (−0.8)	38.8 (3.8)	45.9 (7.7)	54.9 (12.7)	54.1 (12.3)	46.1 (7.8)	34.5 (1.4)	24.9 (−3.9)	18.9 (−7.3)	34.5 (1.4)
Mean daily minimum °F (°C)	13.6 (−10.2)	12.2 (−11.0)	16.8 (−8.4)	21.4 (−5.9)	29.6 (−1.3)	36.0 (2.2)	43.5 (6.4)	42.9 (6.1)	36.3 (2.4)	26.7 (−2.9)	18.2 (−7.7)	12.6 (−10.8)	25.8 (−3.4)
Mean minimum °F (°C)	−8.1 (−22.3)	−8.8 (−22.7)	−2.0 (−18.9)	7.0 (−13.9)	16.6 (−8.6)	26.6 (−3.0)	34.0 (1.1)	32.2 (0.1)	22.3 (−5.4)	8.4 (−13.1)	−1.2 (−18.4)	−7.8 (−22.1)	−19.7 (−28.7)
Record low °F (°C)	−30 (−34)	−42 (−41)	−24 (−31)	−8 (−22)	7 (−14)	16 (−9)	16 (−9)	16 (−9)	4 (−16)	−11 (−24)	−27 (−33)	−39 (−39)	−42 (−41)
Average precipitation inches (mm)	2.07 (53)	2.16 (55)	2.58 (66)	3.50 (89)	3.58 (91)	4.08 (104)	1.72 (44)	1.52 (39)	1.80 (46)	2.16 (55)	2.24 (57)	2.11 (54)	29.52 (753)
Source 1: XMACIS2
Source 2: NOAA (Precipitation)

== See also ==
- List of mountain ranges in Montana
