= Big Belt Mountains =

Section of the Rocky Mountains in Montana, United States

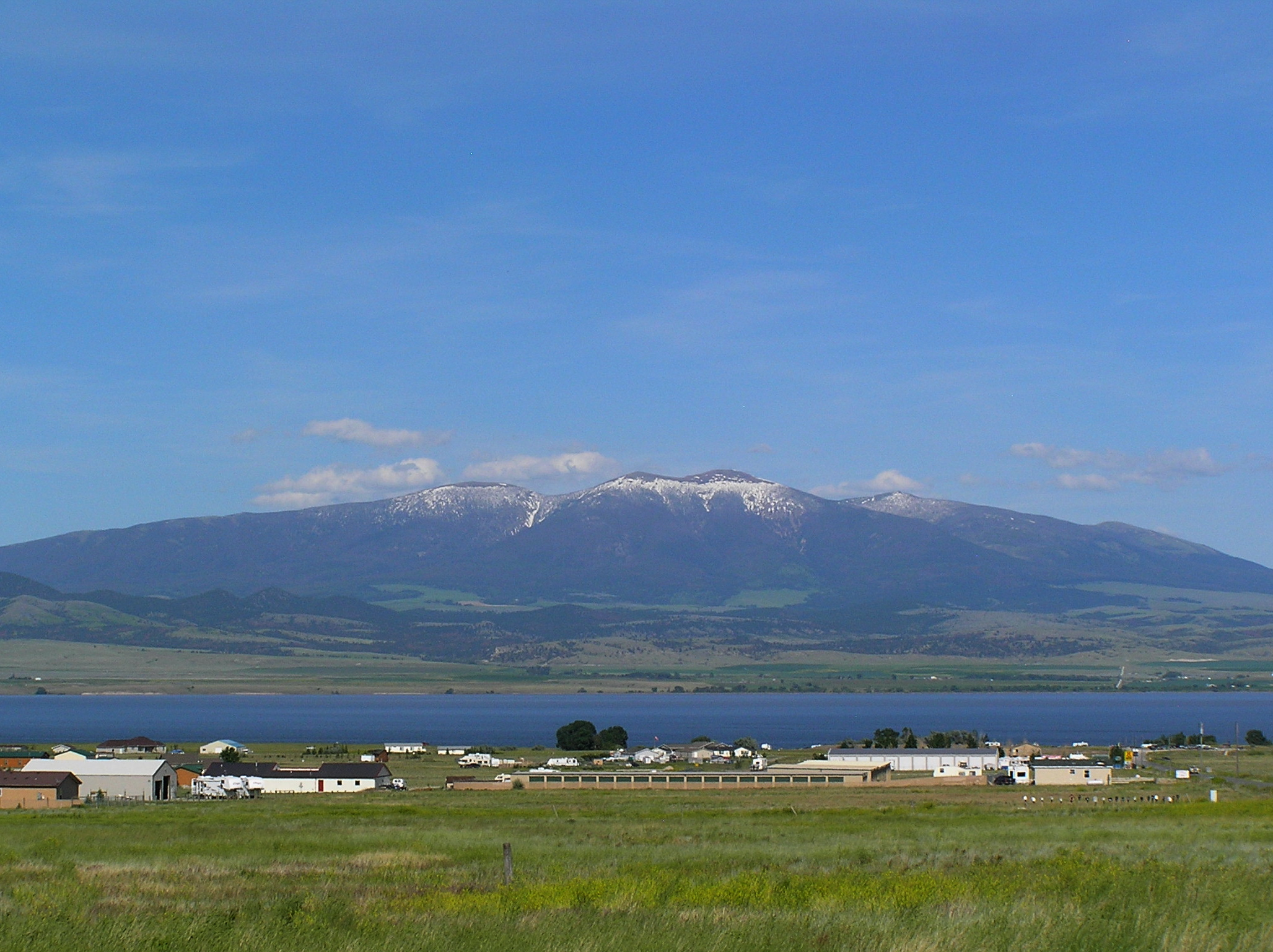
- Mt. Baldy and the Big Belt range near Townsend, Montana

Highest point
- Peak: Mount Edith
- Elevation: 9,504 ft (2,897 m)

Dimensions
- Length: 75 mi (121 km)

Geography
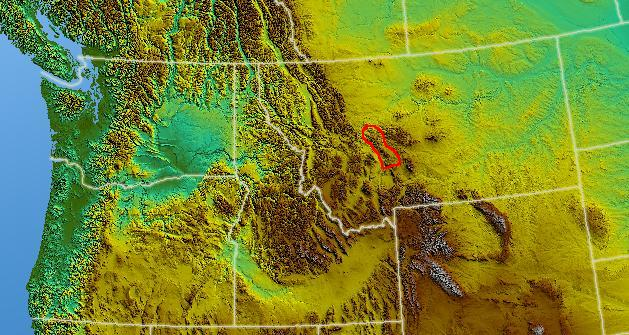
- Country: United States
- Region: Montana
- Range coordinates: 46°27.25′N 111°15.9′W
- Parent range: Rocky Mountains

The Big Belt Mountains are a section of the Rocky Mountains in the U.S. state of Montana. Situated mainly in the Helena National Forest, the mountains are used for logging and recreation for the surrounding residents. Nearby are the cities of Helena, Townsend, and White Sulphur Springs, as well as Canyon Ferry Lake and the Missouri River. The highest point in the Big Belt Range is Mount Edith at 9,504 feet (2,897 m), while the center of the range is 7,385 feet (2,251 m).

The Big Belts lie primarily between the Missouri River drainage to the west and the Smith River drainage to the east. They are traversed by U.S. Highway 12 between Townsend in the Missouri drainage, and White Sulphur Springs in the upper Smith River drainage.

The gulches on the western slopes of the Big Belts were noted historically for rich gold placer strikes. The richest were the 1864 and 1865 placer gold strikes in Confederate Gulch, including Montana Bar, which was one of the most concentrated gold placer strikes ever made.

The range takes its name from the fact it is situated in a long belt-like arc. It stretches 75 miles (121 km), making it a mid-length subrange of the Rocky Mountains. To the east are the Little Belts and to the south, somewhat continuing this arc, is the Bridger Range.

The Belt Supergroup series of rocks, which are primarily Precambrian mudstones, were named after this mountain range and the adjacent Little Belt Mountains. A particularly well-known example of exposed Belt Group mudstones in alternating purplish-red or pale bluish-green layers in the Big Belt Mountains is in Wolf Creek Canyon along Interstate 15 between Helena and Great Falls. While these rocks were named after these ranges of western-central Montana, and are found in them, they are more exposed and better known in northwestern Montana, northern Idaho, and southeastern British Columbia, namely around Flathead Lake and Glacier National Park.

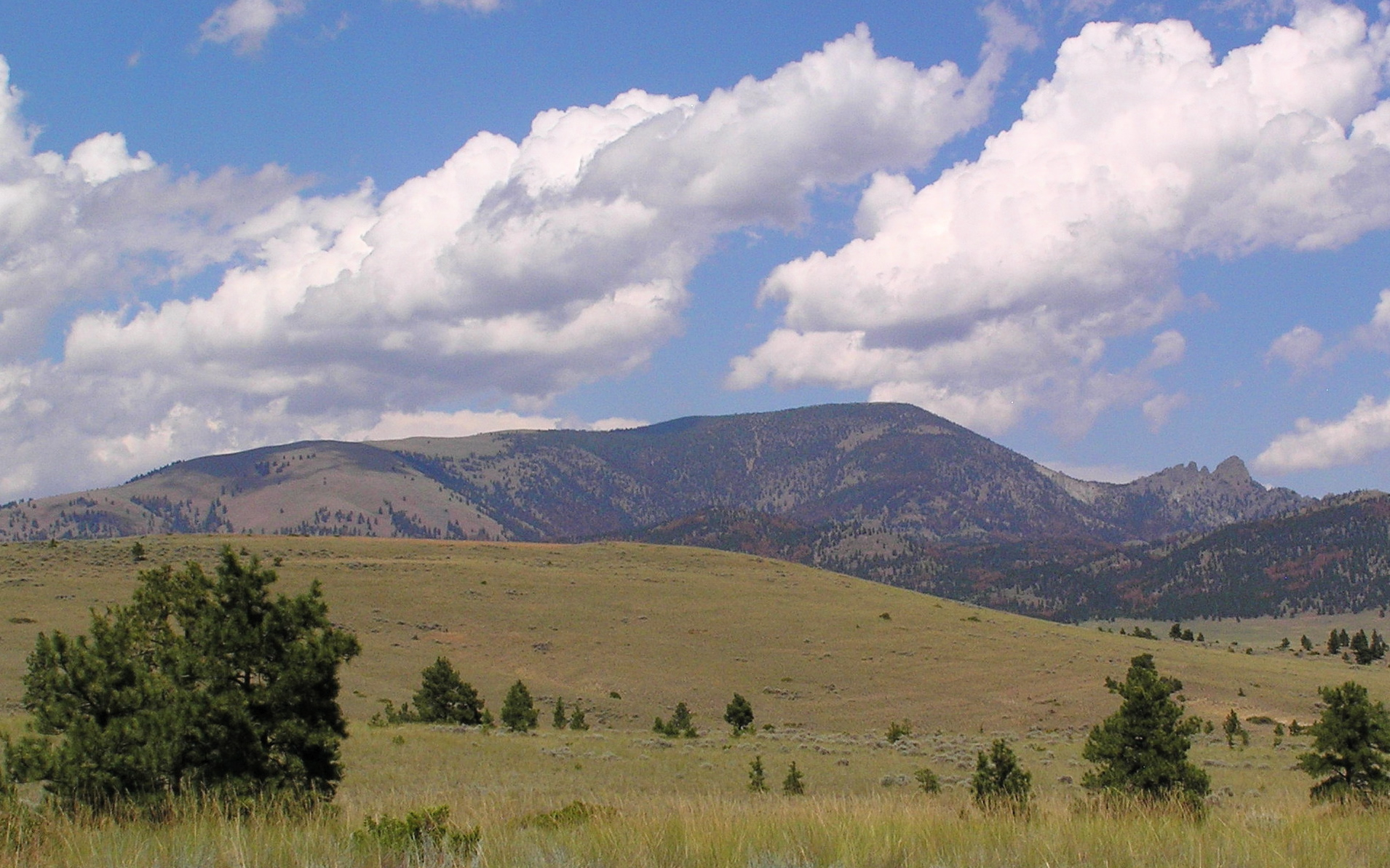
The "Sleeping Giant" mountain formation, on the western edge of the Big Belts, part of the Sleeping Giant Wilderness Study Area

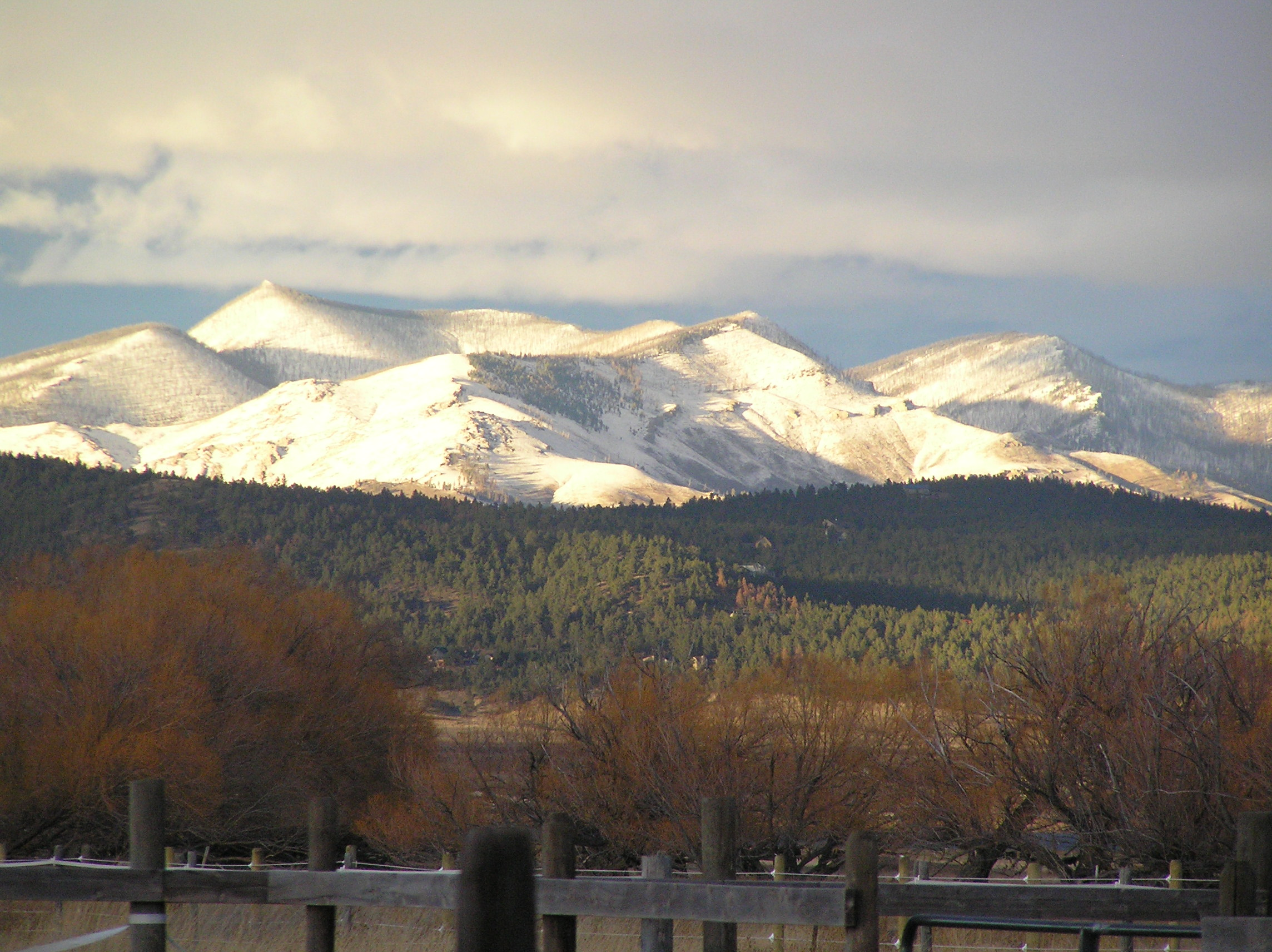
The Big Belts in late fall as viewed northeast of Helena

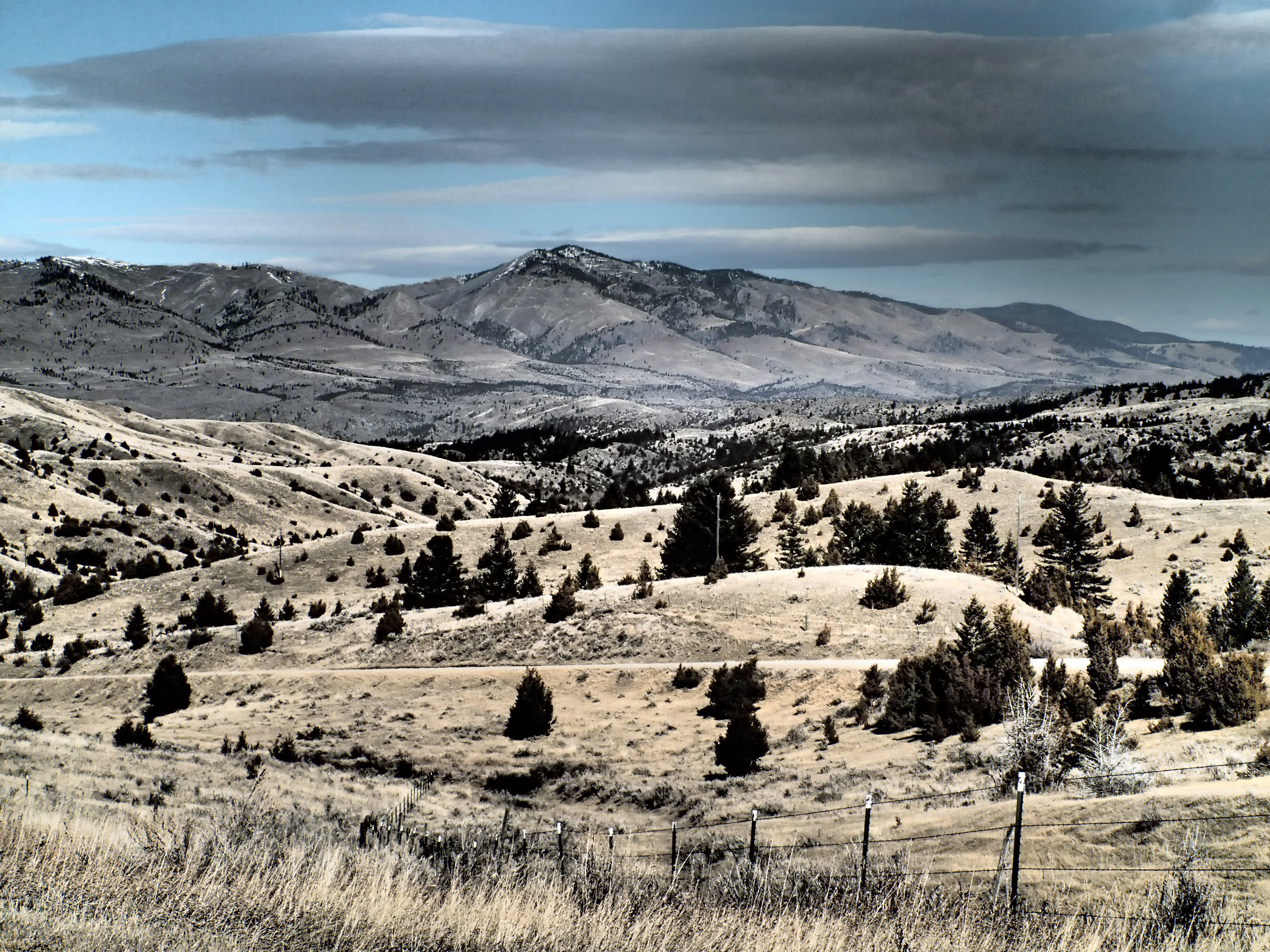
Wall Mountain, southeast face of Big Belt Mountains

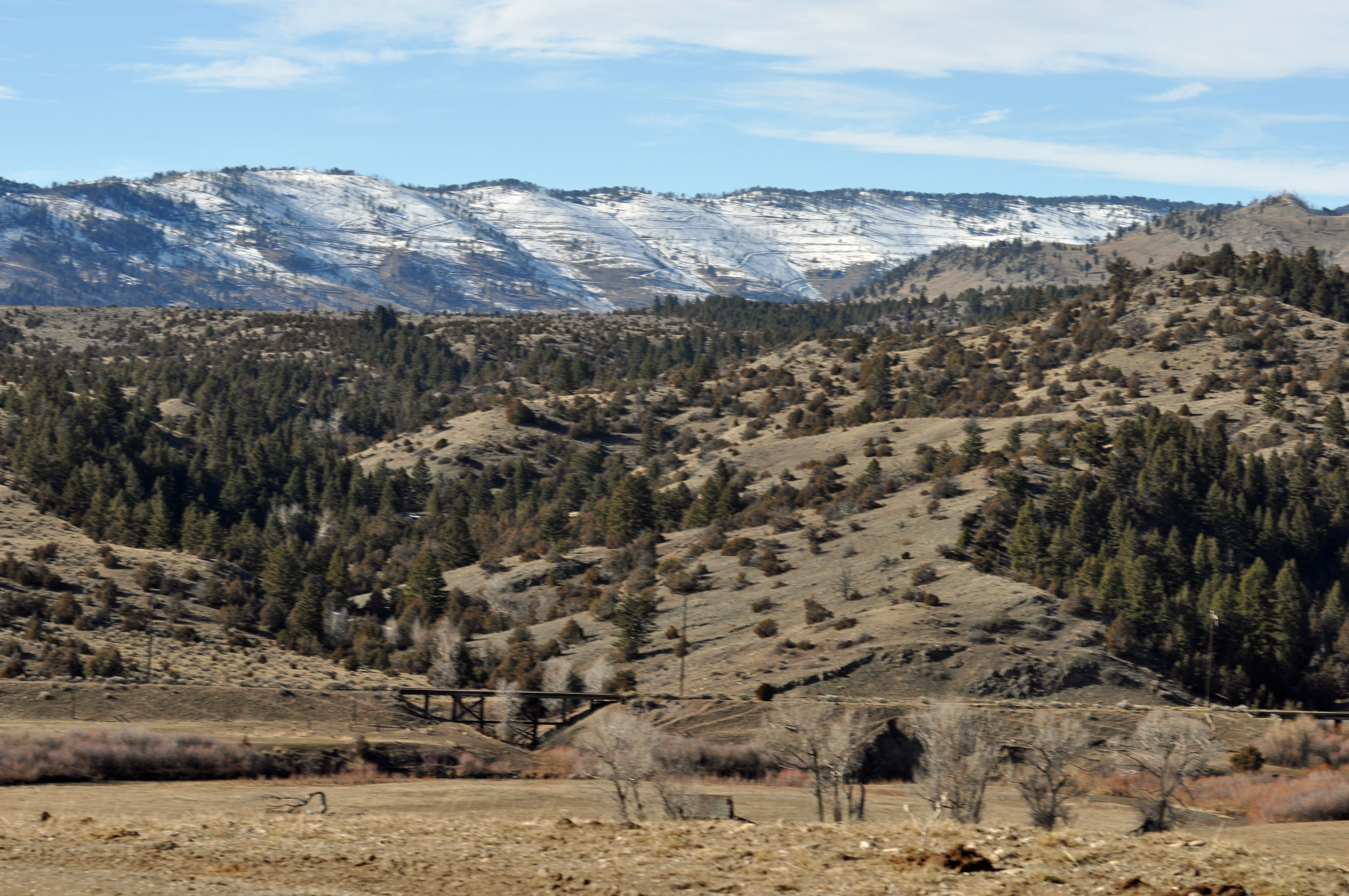
Sixmile Mountain from 16 Mile Creek

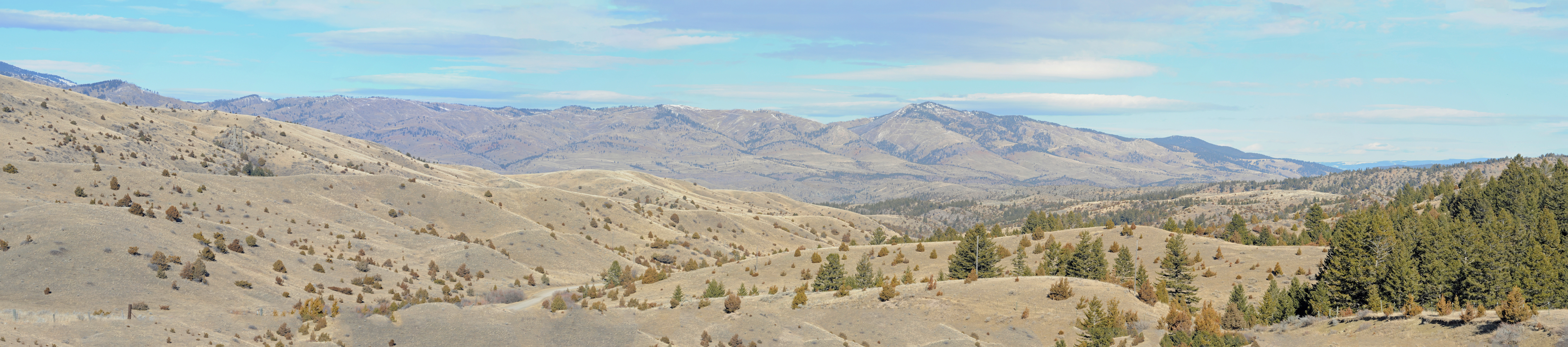
South face of Big Belt Mountains, from Dry Creek Road south of Maudlow

== See also ==
- List of mountain ranges in Montana
