= City Gate (disambiguation) =

A city gate is a gate which is, or was, set within a city wall

== Places ==
=== Gates ===
- City Gate, Chittagong, a gate located in Chittagong, southeastern Bangladesh
- City gates of Paris in French "portes de Paris", access points to the city of Paris for pedestrians and other road users
- City Gate (Valletta), a gate located at the entrance of Valletta, Malta
- Martin city gate, one of three still existing city gates of Cochem, Germany

=== Other places ===
- City Gate (Frankfurt), a skyscraper in Frankfurt, Germany
- City Gate (Port of Spain), the main terminal for the buses and maxi taxis in Port of Spain, Trinidad and Tobago
- City Gate (Warsaw), a skyscraper in Warsaw, Poland
- City Gate Mahon, office and medical complex in Mahon, Cork, Ireland
- City Gate Towers (Romanian: Turnurile "Porţile Oraşului"), two office buildings in Bucharest, Romania
- Eastern City Gate (Serbian: Istočna Kapija Beograda), a complex of three large residential buildings in Belgrade, Serbia
- Western City Gate (Serbian: Zapadna Kapija Beograda), a skyscraper in Belgrade, Serbia

== Other uses ==
- City Gates (album), a 1983 album by the George Adams-Don Pullen Quartet

== See also ==
- Moshe Aviv Tower, commonly known as City Gate (Hebrew: שער העיר), its original name
- Gate City (disambiguation)
