= Rudolf Steinberg =

Rudolf Steinberg (born 23 June 1943 in Cochem, Rhine Province) is professor emeritus for public law and from 2000 to 2008 was president of the Johann Wolfgang Goethe University in Frankfurt.

== Life ==
After studying classics for his Abitur in Gelsenkirchen, Steinberg studied law and economic science at the universities of Freiburg and Cologne before turning to political science at the University of Michigan. In 1970 he received a doctorate from the University of Freiburg after publishing a thesis entitled Staatslehre und Interessenverbände: Interessenverbände im Spiegel amerikanischer und deutscher Literatur und Rechtsprechung“ (in English:State theory and associations: Associations reflected in American and German literature and jurisdiction). In 1977 he published his habilitation thesis entitled Politik und Verwaltungsorganisation: zur Reform der Regierungs- und Verwaltungsorganisation unter besonderer Berücksichtigung der Obersten Bundesbehörden in den Vereinigten Staaten von Amerika (Politics and administrative organisation: reform of governmental and administrative organisations with special consideration of the highest federal authorities in the United States of America.

From 1977 until 1980 Rudolf Steinberg was professor for public law at the Leibniz University Hannover before he held the chair for public law, environmental law and administrative science at Goethe University Frankfurt until 2000.

As a scientist, Rudolf Steinberg is mainly interested in how governments and administrations act. He took himself part in a number of round table mediations, trying to reconcile the public interests represented by the state and the civil interest. He also pleaded in some notable cases concerning nuclear power before the Federal Constitutional Court of Germany, or Bundesverfassungsgericht, taking sides for environmental concerns. Rudolf Steinberg specialised in the law of public planning. During the last five years of his being an active professor he also was a judge at the constitutional court of the State of Thuringia at Weimar. He also acted as a goodwill ambassador for Friedrich Ebert Foundation.

As university president, Steinberg was the "architect" of the whole process of restructuring Frankfurt Goethe University. Together with vice president Ingwer Ebsen, he managed to transform the state university into a foundation of public law that keeps being funded largely by the State of Hesse, but that is much more independent from political influence than before. At that time, Frankfurt university began to move from its former campus at Bockenheim to its new location in the Westend district, where the U.S. army had just handed back the former IG Farben Building to German authorities. The old building was restructured, and new modern buildings with lecture halls, libraries, and offices were raised, as Goethe University became one of the highest ranking universities in Germany. Privately funded research almost tripled.

This process of restructuring met with harsh criticism by students, as it went hand in hand with the so-called Bologna Process reforms, and with the first-time introduction of tuition payments at universities in the State of Hesse. Steinberg was blamed for favouring the legal and the economics department over sociology and the humanities, while a so-called cluster of excellence co-funded by Deutsche Forschungsgemeinschaft on The formation of normative orders (Die Herausbildung normativer Ordnungen) was created, comprising also philosophers and social scientists.

With nine years in the office, none of Steinberg's predecessors served a longer term than he did. He announced that he will step back as university president on the day after his 65th birthday for the end of 2008. Werner Müller-Esterl was elected his successor.

Rudolf Steinberg was awarded two civil medals for his lifetime achievements, the Hessischer Verdienstorden of the State of Hesse in 2009, and the Ehrenplakette der Stadt Frankfurt am Main in 2012.

He is married and has four children.

== Writings ==
- Staatslehre und Interessenverbände: Interessenverbände im Spiegel amerikanischer und deutscher Literatur und Rechtsprechung - eine kritische Gegenüberstellung. Freiburg (Breisgau), Univ., Diss., 1970.
- Politik und Verwaltungsorganisation: zur Reform der Regierungs- und Verwaltungsorganisation unter besonderer Berücksichtigung der Obersten Bundesbehörden in den Vereinigten Staaten von Amerika. Baden-Baden: Nomos-Verl.-Ges., 1979. ISBN 3-7890-0462-6 Zugl.: Freiburg i. Br., Univ., Habil.-Schr., 1978. New edition: BWV, Berliner Wissenschafts-Verlag, Berlin 2004, ISBN 3-8305-0689-9.
- Together with Thomas Berg and Martin Wickel: Fachplanung. 4. Aufl. Baden-Baden: Nomos-Verl.-Ges., 2012. ISBN 978-3-8329-7610-1.
- Der ökologische Verfassungsstaat. Frankfurt am Main: Suhrkamp, 1998. ISBN 3-518-58269-0.
- Die neue Universität Frankfurt am Main. Ihr Neubau und ihre Rückkehr zur Stiftungsuniversität. Societätsverlag, Frankfurt am Main 2013, ISBN 978-3-942921-53-4.
- Die Repräsentation des Volkes: Menschenbild und demokratisches Regierungssystem. Nomos, Baden-Baden 2013, ISBN 978-3-8487-0317-3.
- Kopftuch und Burka: Laizität, Toleranz und religiöse Homogenität in Deutschland und Frankreich. Nomos, Baden-Baden 2015, ISBN 978-3848728558.
