= Cochem =

- Town
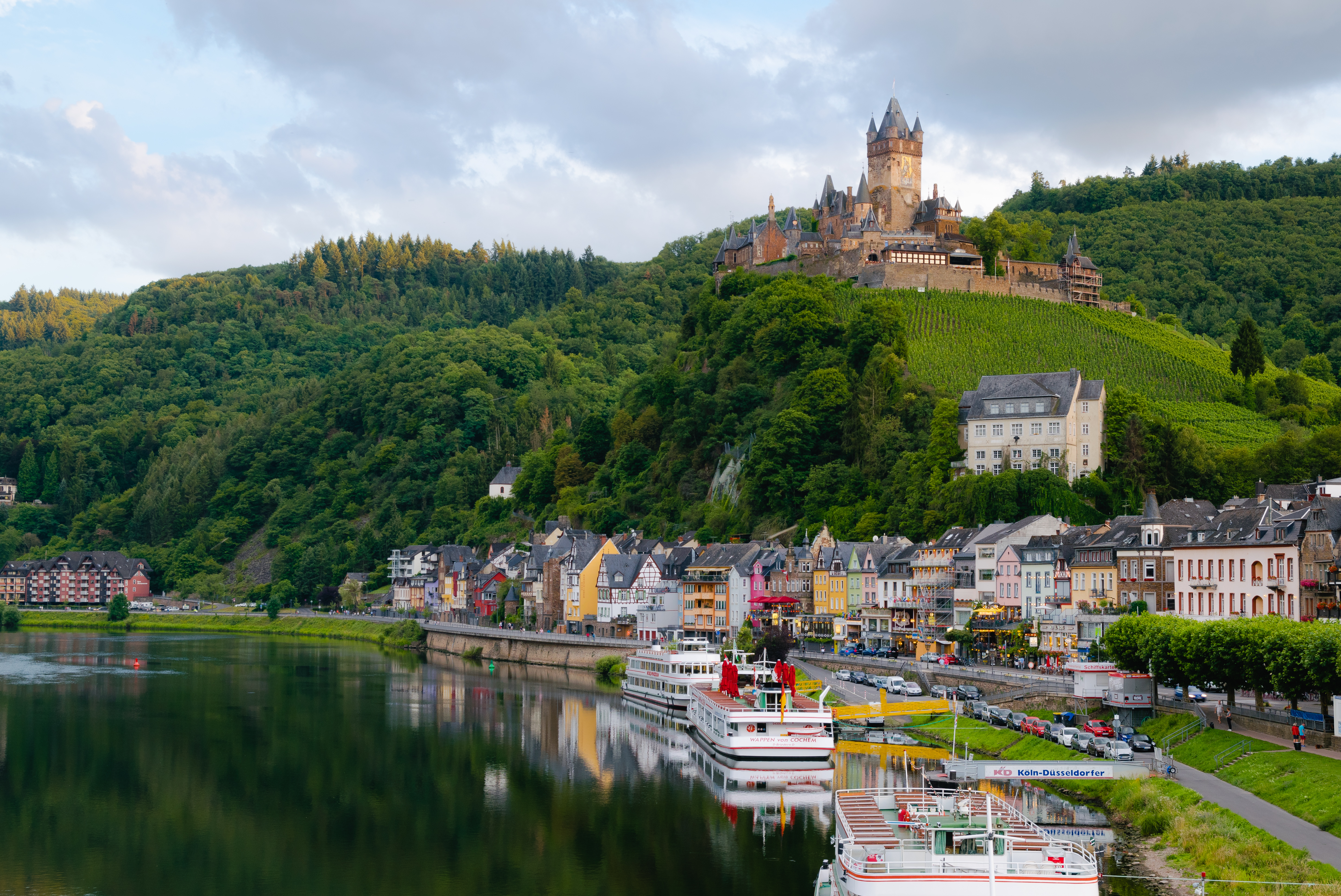

- Coat of arms

- Location of Cochem within Cochem-Zell district
- Interactive map of Cochem
- Location within Germany Location within Rhineland-Palatinate
- Coordinates: 50°8′49″N 7°10′0″E
- Country: Germany
- State: Rhineland-Palatinate
- District: Cochem-Zell
- Municipal assoc.: Cochem
- Subdivisions: 4

Government
  - Mayor (2019–24): Walter Schmitz (CDU)

Area
  - Total: 21.18 km^{2} (8.18 sq mi)
- Elevation: 83 m (272 ft)

Population (2025-12-31)
  - Total: 4,897
  - Density: 231.2/km^{2} (598.8/sq mi)
- Time zone: UTC+01:00 (CET)
  - Summer (DST): UTC+02:00 (CEST)
- Postal codes: 56812
- Dialling codes: 02671
- Vehicle registration: COC
- Website: www.cochem.de

Cochem (German pronunciation: [ˈkɔxm̩]) is a town in Rhineland-Palatinate, Germany. Situated on the banks of the Moselle River, it is the administrative seat of the Cochem-Zell district and its largest town with around 5,300 inhabitants. The town is known for its riverside setting, historic old town, and the hilltop Reichsburg Cochem, which overlooks the Moselle valley.

First mentioned in the Early Middle Ages, Cochem developed as a regional centre of trade and viticulture within the Electorate of Trier. The town suffered significant destruction during the Nine Years' War in 1689 and was later rebuilt.

Cochem is an important centre for tourism in the Moselle wine region, while wine production continues to play a significant role in the local economy.

== Geography ==
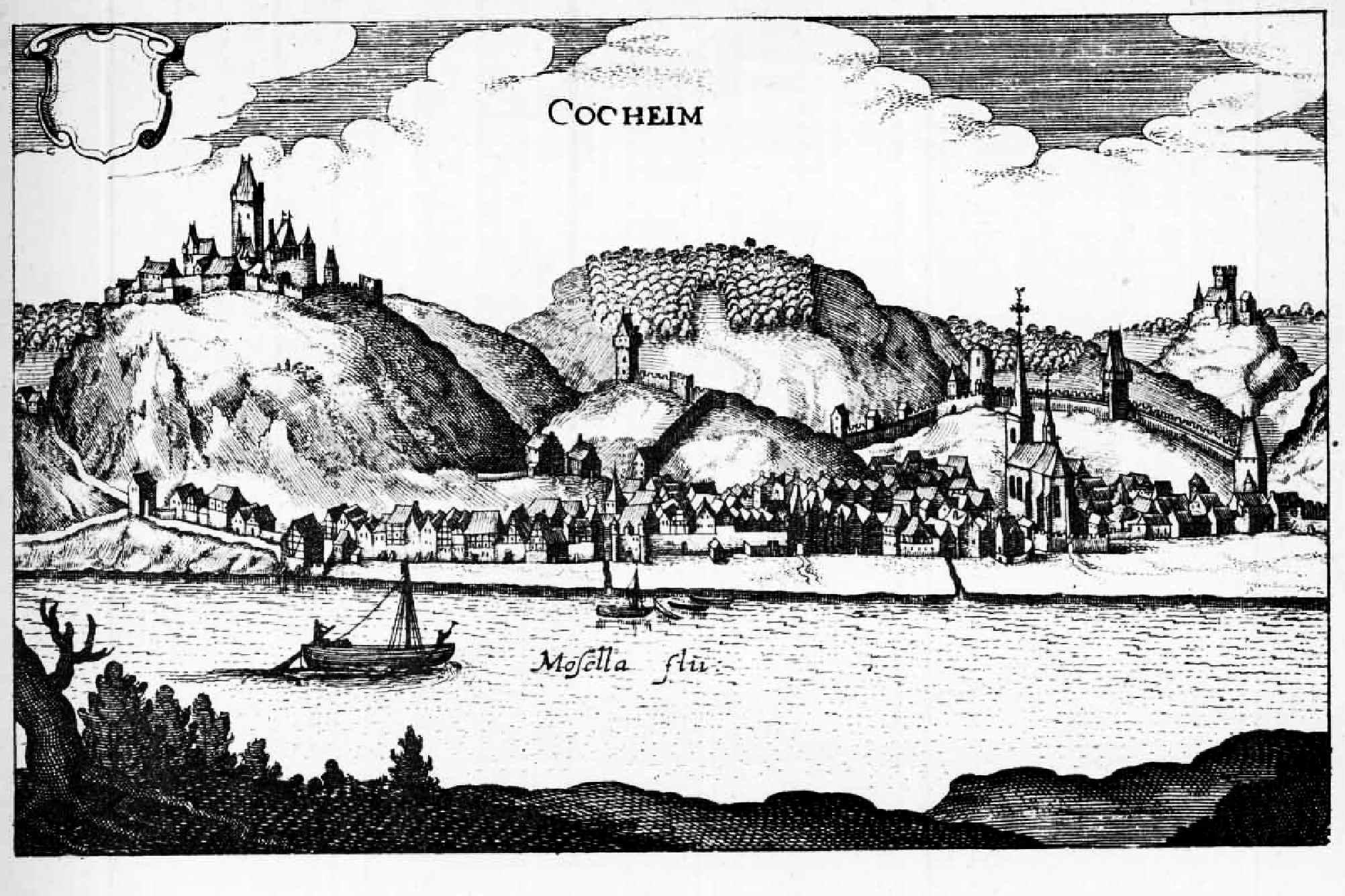
Cochem in 1646

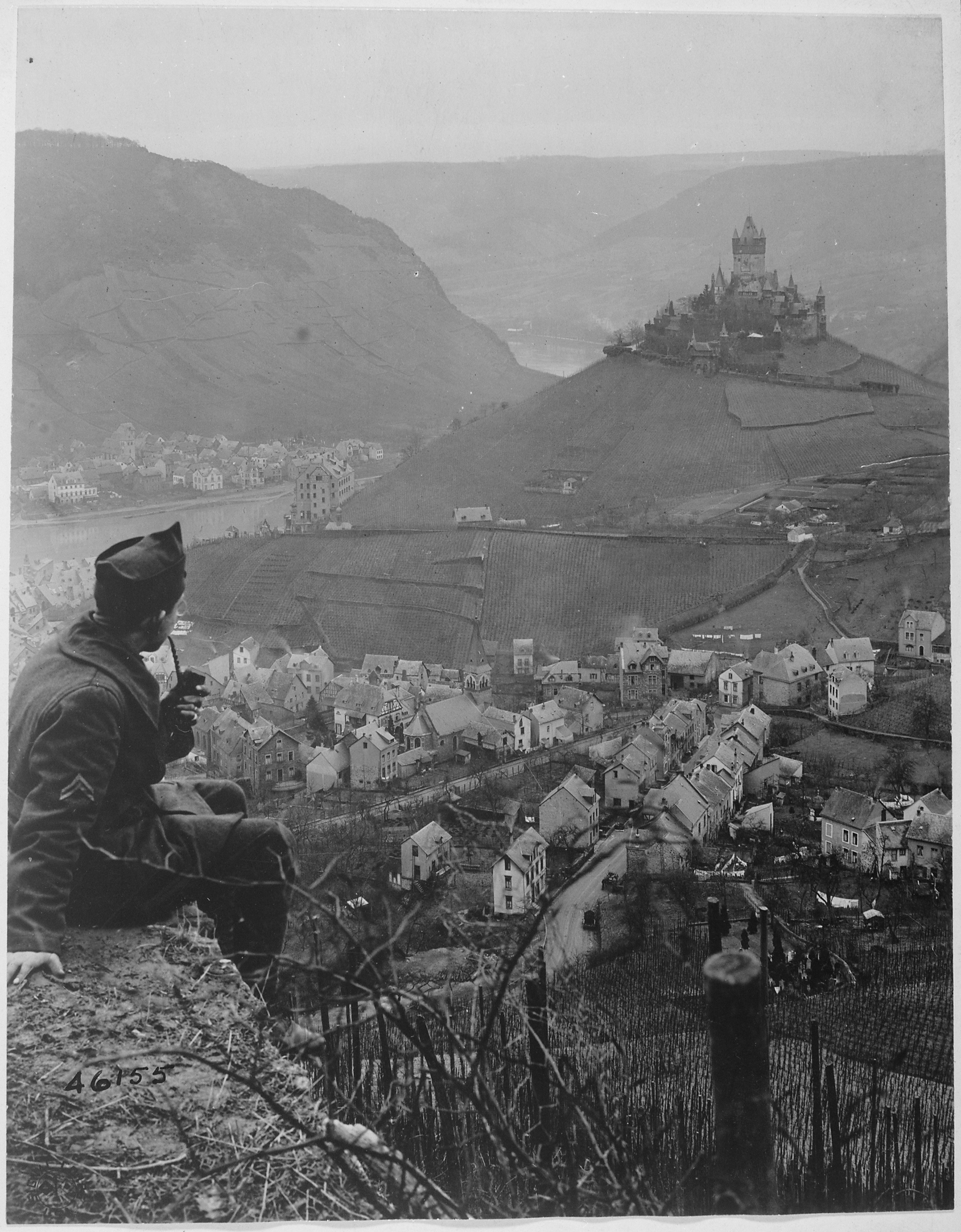
The old imperial castle above the Moselle River in Cochem was home to the IV Corps, U.S. Army, during 1919.

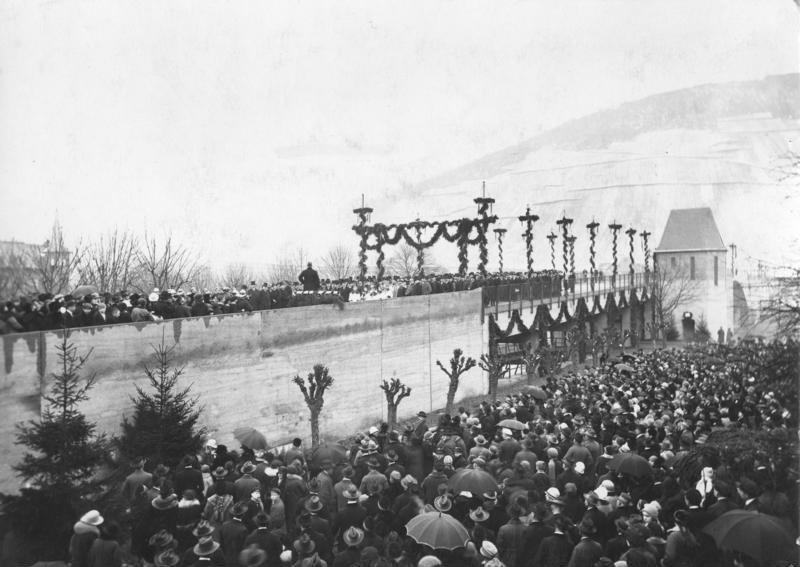
Dedication of the "Skagerrak Bridge" on 23 January 1927

Cochem lies at an elevation of some 83 m above sea level and the municipal area measures 21.2 km^{2}. The town centre with the outlying centre of Sehl upstream lies on the Moselle's left bank, while the constituent centre of Cond lies on its right. A further constituent centre, Brauheck, with its commercial area, air force barracks and new town development, lies in the heights of the Eifel on Bundesstraße 259, some 2 km (1 mi) from the town centre. Emptying into the Moselle in Cochem are the Kraklebach, the Ebernacher Bach, the Sehlerbach, the Falzbach, the Märtscheltbach and the Enthetbach.

== History ==
Cochem was settled as early as Celtic and Roman times. In 866, it had its first documentary mention as Villa cuchema. Other names yielded by history are Cuhckeme and Chuckeme in 893, Cochemo in 1051, Chuchumo in 1056, Kuchema in 1130, Cuchemo in 1136, Cocheme in 1144, then Cuchme, and into the 18th century Cochheim or Cocheim. Cochem was an Imperial estate. It was pledged by King Adolf of Nassau in 1294 to the Archbishopric of Trier and remained Electoral-Trier territory until the French occupation began in 1794. In 1332, Cochem was granted town rights, and shortly thereafter, the town fortifications, which still stand today, were built. Between 1423 and 1425, the town was stricken with a Plague epidemic. In 1623, Elector Lothar von Metternich brought about the founding of a Capuchin monastery. In the Thirty Years' War, the town was besieged, but not conquered. In 1689, during the Nine Years' War, King Louis XIV's troops first burnt the Winneburg (castle) down and then conquered the town of Cochem with its castle. Reconstruction was long and drawn out. Beginning in 1794, Cochem lay under French rule. In 1815, it was assigned to the Kingdom of Prussia at the Congress of Vienna.

Louis Fréderic Jacques Ravené bought the ruin of the former Imperial castle in 1866 and began its reconstruction. Only after a bridge was built across the Moselle at Cochem in 1927 were the two fishing villages of Cond and Sehl amalgamated with the town in the course of administrative reform in 1932. This bridge, called the "Skagerrak Bridge", was dedicated on 23 January 1927. In the Second World War, great parts of Cochem's old town were destroyed. Also during the war, the operations staff of the underground subcamp of Zeisig of the Natzweiler concentration camp between the villages of Bruttig and Treis was located here. At its height, 13,000 people were imprisoned. They provided slave labour for Bosch, which made spark plugs, ignition systems, and glow plugs, which were important to the German war effort, under brutal conditions.

Since 1946, Cochem has been part of the then newly founded state of Rhineland-Palatinate.

== Politics ==
=== Town council ===
The council is made up of 22 council members, who were elected at the municipal election held on 26 May 2019, and the honorary mayor as chairman.

The municipal election held on 26 May 2019 yielded the following results:

	SPD	CDU	Grüne	CBG	FWG	Total
2019	6	9	3	2	3	22 seats
2014	6	9	2	3	2	22 seats
2009	6	9	2	3	2	22 seats
2004	6	10	1	3	2	22 seats
1999	6	11	1	2	2	22 seats
1994	7	10	3	2	–	22 seats
1989	6	10	2	3	–	21 seats
1984	7	9	–	5	–	21 seats
1979	7	11	–	3	–	21 seats
1974	5	10	–	6	–	21 seats

=== Mayor ===
Cochem's mayor is since 2018 Walter Schmitz, and his deputies are Josef Heimes, Wilfried Gerdes and Heinz Bremm.

- Wilhelm Schmitz, 1919–1923
- Karl Stier, 1925–1934
- Aloys Elsen, 1934–1945
- Jakob Rudolf Pauly, 1945–1949
- Ferdinand Hillebrand, 1949–1956
- Willy Massoth, (1911–1978), 1957–1969, first full-time mayor
- Anno Vey, 1969–1975
- Horst Hoffmann, 1975–1995
- Herbert Hilken, 1995–2011
- Wolfgang Lambertz, 2011–2018
- Walter Schmitz, (opted 2018)

=== Coat of arms ===
The town's arms might be described thus: Per pale argent a cross gules and gules issuant from dexter a sinister hand of the first vested sable holding two keys in saltire Or, the wards to chief.

The town of Cochem and its castle were held by the Archbishops of Trier beginning in 1298. They also granted Cochem town rights in 1332. The charges in the town's arms are thus purely references to its long history with the Electorate of Trier. The red cross on the dexter (armsbearer's right, viewer's left) side is Trier's old armorial bearing, and the keys on the sinister (armsbearer's left, viewer's right) side are Saint Peter's attribute, thus representing Trier's patron. This composition appeared in the earliest known town seal, from the early 15th century, which likely dates from a bit earlier, the late 14th century.

=== Town partnerships ===
Cochem fosters partnerships with the following places:

- Avallon, Yonne, France since 1966
- Malmedy, Liège, Belgium since 1975
- (Germany) Moritzburg, Meißen, Saxony since 1990
- Yizhou District, Hechi, China since 2017

=== Political development ===
After both the town council and the Verbandsgemeinde council approved the motion on 23 October 2008, the until then Verbandsgemeinde-free town of Cochem became part of the Verbandsgemeinde of Cochem-Land on 7 June 2009. In connection with this, the state government also enacted a law on 18 February 2009 that deals with, among other things, the transfer of ownership of certain properties from the town to the Verbandsgemeinde. The Verbandsgemeinde also changed its name with the amalgamation of Cochem, becoming the Verbandsgemeinde of Cochem.

== Culture and sightseeing ==
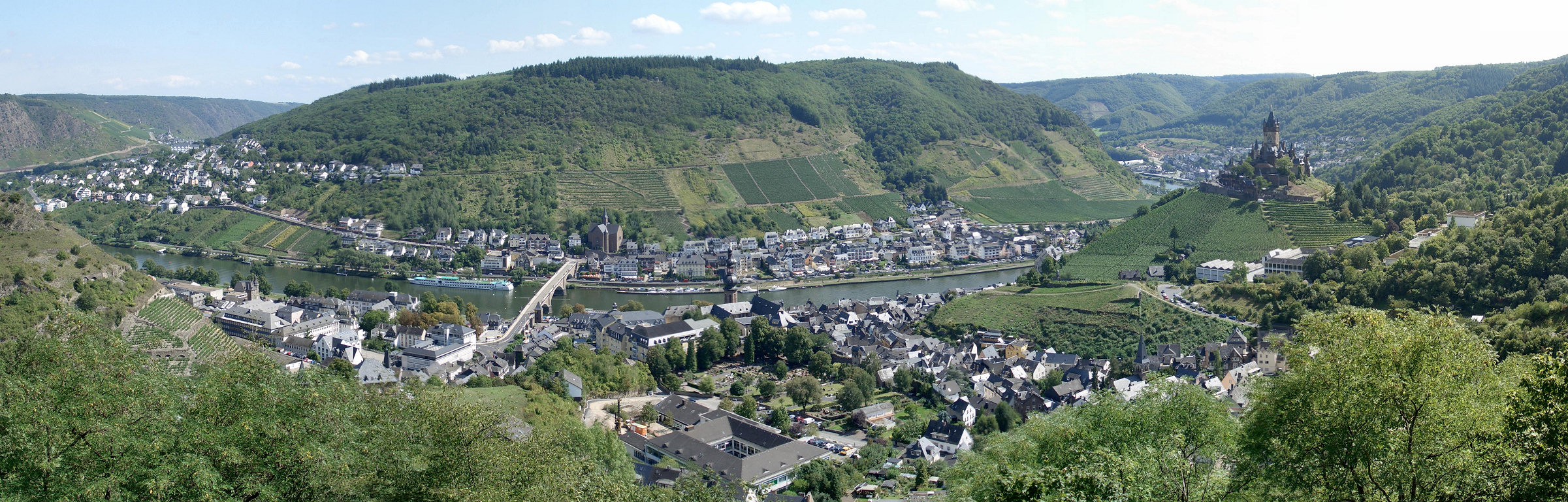
Panorama of Cochem with the Cochem Imperial Castle on the upper right

=== Buildings ===
The following are listed buildings or sites in Rhineland-Palatinate's Directory of Cultural Monuments:

==== Cochem (main centre) ====
- Bahnhofsvorplatz 1 – new railway station, 1900–1902; picturesquely grouped three-floor quarrystone building, Renaissance Revival, with smaller wings and additions, partly timber-frame; old railway station, 1880, quarrystone and brick building, partly timber-frame; railway lands, brick building; whole complex
- Bernstraße 2 – rectory or parish house; Baroque Revival timber-frame house, partly solid, mansard roof, about 1910
- Bernstraße 3 – timber-frame house, partly solid, mansard roof, 18th century
- Bernstraße 9 – four-floor timber-frame house, partly solid, 17th century
- Bernstraße 22/24 – walkway through to the Moselle at Baroque building with hipped mansard roof, 1749
- Bernstraße 31 – three-floor solid building, from 1775 and 1896 (conversion)
- Branntweingässchen 2 – timber-frame house on quarrystone pedestal, 17th century
- Brückenstraße 3, Endertstraße 4 – Hotel "Alte Torschenke"; building with mansard roof with gables set slantwise, about 1910
- Burgfrieden 3 – former Electoral-Trier courthouse; two three-floor timber-frame houses, partly solid, latter half of the 17th century
- Burgfrieden 11 – brick building, 19th century; side towards the Moselle: four-floor quarrystone building with oriel, 19th or 20th century
- Burgfrieden 13/14 – side towards the street: timber-frame house in mixed building styles, plastered; side towards the Moselle: timber-frame house with balcony
- Burgfrieden 18 – three-floor Late Classicist house, earlier half of the 19th century
- Endertstraße 2 – "Alte Torschenke" ("Old Gateway Inn"); three-floor timber-frame house, partly solid, from 1626; hearth heating plates; Saint Roch, 17th or 18th century
- Endertstraße 7 – Late Historicist quarrystone building, Renaissance Revival, from 1899
- Endertstraße/Brückenstraße (monumental zone) – Kaiser-Wilhelm-Tunnel: bridge and teaching workshop used by the repair works; tunnel portal, sandstone, from 1877 and 1879; bridge: stone block building; teaching workshop: two-floor quarrystone pedestal and steel framework floor, about 1900
- Endertstraße 146 – Saint Anthony's Chapel (Kapelle St Anton); small aisleless church, partly timber-frame, half-hipped roof, 17th century
- Capuchin Monastery and Church (monumental zone) – church and sickroom, 1625–1628, church lengthened in 1692, aisleless church with lady's chapel, Baroque décor; monastery founded in 1623, cloister's east and north wings, about 1630, west wing 1692; guest building 1753; Way of the Cross to the town, 1758; attached old elementary school, about 1910
- Graveyard (monumental zone) – laid out towards the end of the 19th century, warriors' memorial 1864/1866/1870/1871 and warriors' memorial 1914/18, 1920s; graveyard cross from 1850; three metal crosses, 19th century; gravestones from the 19th century
- Heiligenhäuschen (a small, shrinelike structure consecrated to a saint or saints) – plastered building with three niches, 1710, endower's coat of arms from Archbishop Johann VIII Hugo von Orsbeck; wayside cross, 18th century
- Herrenstraße 24 – three-floor timber-frame house, partly solid, early 17th century
- Kelberger Straße (monumental zone) – Jewish graveyard in an enclosed area with a gate with a pointed arch, 64 grave steles from 1879 to the 1940s
- Hinter Kempen – chapel, 19th century
- Kelberger Straße 40 – Villa Schönblick; Late Historicist quarrystone building, hipped roof, late 19th century; prominent location above the town, opposite the castle
- Kirchgasse 4 – three-floor timber-frame house, partly solid, 18th century
- Klosterberg 3 – old elementary school, hipped roof, about 1910
- Löhrstraße 3 – three-floor timber-frame house, partly solid, from 1599, conversions beginning in the 18th century; in the quarrystone wall a grave cross, 18th century
- Löhrstraße 15 – three-floor timber-frame house, partly solid, about 1700 or from the 18th century; side house (no number) timber-frame house, partly solid
- Markt – town hall; building with mansard roof, after destruction in 1689 underwent reconstruction until 1739, completed by Philipp Honorius Ravensteyn
- Markt – fountain, basalt basin, from 1767, architect Nikolaus Lauxen
- Markt 4 – four-floor timber-frame building, partly solid, from 1610 and 1990
- Markt 5 – four-floor timber-frame house, partly solid, mansard roof, late 17th century
- Markt 6/7 – four-floor timber-frame building, partly solid, latter half of the 17th century
- Markt 9 – coat of arms, from 1699
- Markt 11 – three-floor timber-frame building, partly solid, plastered, from 1690
- Markt 15 – three-floor solid building, partly timber-frame, about 1690; in the back remnants of a solid building, 16th century, timber-frame parts newer
- Moselpromenade 1 – see Bernstraße 22/24
- Moselpromenade 9 – gateway arch, 14th century; see Town wall (monumental zone)
- Moselpromenade 11/12 – three-floor quarrystone building, crow-stepped gable, from 1654, expansion from 1894 or 1899
- Moselpromenade 18 – solid building with timber-frame gable, late 19th century, heavily altered by commercial modifications
- Moselpromenade 27 – two four-floor timber-frame houses, plastered, late 17th or early 18th century
- Moselpromenade 28 – Late Historicist hotel; three-floor quarrystone building, Renaissance Revival, from 1893
- Moselpromenade 37 – plastered building, partly timber-frame, early 20th century
- Moselpromenade 39 – see Burgfrieden 11
- Moselpromenade 40 – see Burgfrieden 13/14
- Moselpromenade 60 – Late Historicist winery, 1881–1882, building adviser R. A. Schmidt in collaboration with Julius Raschdorff; picturesque winemaker's villa, quarrystone, timber-frame commercial wing, garden; whole complex of buildings
- Moselpromenade/Burgfrieden (monumental zone) – group of buildings built before the 17th or 18th century along with a few less old buildings, about 1900
- Moselstraße 8 – quarrystone villa, about 1900
- Moselstraße 18 – villa; two-winged quarrystone building, partly timber-frame, early 20th century; sandstone sculpture
- Oberbachstraße 14 – "Zom Stüffje" inn; timber-frame building, partly solid, essentially from the 16th century, façade from the 18th century
- Oberbachstraße 17/19 – double timber-frame house, plastered, early 18th century
- Oberbachstraße 23 – three-floor timber-frame house, partly solid, late 17th or early 18th century; wooden sculpture, about 1700
- Oberbachstraße 25 – timber-frame house, partly solid, 18th century
- Oberbachstraße 46 – Evangelical church; Gothic Revival aisleless church, 1892–1893
- Behind Oberer Weg 9 – columbarium; three-floor tower, from 1898
- Obergasse 1 – three-floor house, timber-frame upper floor from 1839, essentially possibly older
- Obergasse 22 – sculpture of Saint Peter, 19th century
- Obergasse 24 – timber-frame house, partly solid, from 1704
- Pater-Martin-Straße 1 – Saint Martin's Catholic Parish Church (Pfarrkirche St. Martin); Late Gothic quire, between 1456 and 1503; quarrystone aisleless church, 1950–1951, architect Dominikus Böhm, Cologne; quarrystone tower with onion cupola, 1955–1963
- Pater-Martin-Straße 1 – three-floor building with mansard roof, about 1910
- Saint Roch's Plague Chapel (Pestkapelle St. Rochus); Baroque aisleless church, 1680; Late Gothic keystone, 15th century; cross fragments
- Town wall (monumental zone) – begun in 1332, reinforced in 1675; preserved: mediaeval Enderttor (gate), after 1352, with "Alter Torschänke" (1626); Kirchgasse town wall gate, 14th century; town wall at Capuchin monastery/graveyard with Balduinstor ("Baldwin's Gate") and further wall remnants; Martinstor ("Martin's Gate") or Mäuseturm ("Mice's Tower")
- Pinnerweg 10 – narrow gauge railway, 1879
- Ravenestraße 15 – Late Classicist plastered building, mid to late 19th century
- Ravenestraße 17 – so-called Landratsvilla (Landrat is the title given the head of a district council in Germany); Late Classicist plastered building, 1876
- Ravenestraße 32 – quarrystone building, from 1907
- Ravenestraße 38 – quarrystone building 1900
- Ravenestraße 39 – Amt court; building with half-hipped roof, crow-stepped gable risalto, 1891–1893, government building councillor NN
- Ravenestraße 41 – plastered building, partly timber-frame, early 20th century
- Ravenestraße 43 – three-floor plastered building, Renaissance Revival, about 1900-1910
- Schlaufstraße 5 – three-floor timber-frame house, partly solid, 17th century
- Schlaufstraße 7 – three-floor timber-frame house, partly solid, 18th century, expansion in 19th century
- Schloßstraße 11, 13 – former school, 18th/19th century; three-floor plastered building; pavilion, mid 19th century
- Weinbergshäuschen ("Little Vineyard House"); one-floor quarrystone building, mid 19th century
- Chapel; aisleless church, from 1892, Pietà, 18th or 19th century
- Way of the Cross to the Chapel at the Three Crosses; Bildstock type with sandstone reliefs, about 1900; chapel, quarrystone building, from 1856
- Löscher Hof – Lescherlinde (limetree), chapel and grave crosses; chapel, 19th century
- former Cochem Imperial castle, whole complex; begun possibly in the 10th century or about 1020, expanded in 1051 and in the earlier half of the 14th century, blown up in 1689, reconstructed in 1868 and between 1874 and 1877; Gothic Revival castle, mediaeval keep, inside from the earlier half of the 11th century, encased in the 14th century; garden pavilion, 19th century
- Ruin of the Winneburg (castle)
- Below Cochem castle in the woods – Jewish graveyard; seven gravestones, the oldest from 1836–1837

==== Cond ====
- Kapellenstraße/corner of Bergstraße – Chapel of the Fourteen Holy Helpers (Vierzehnnothelferkapelle); small quarrystone aisleless church, 19th century
- Pastor-Ziegler-Platz – Saint Remaclus's Old Catholic Church (Alte Katholische Kirche St. Remaklus); three-floor Romanesque tower, 12th century (?); within, a Christ figure as a warriors' memorial
- Stadionstraße – sandstone relief
- Stadionstraße 1 – Winemaker's villa; quarrystone building, partly timber-frame, from 1905
- Talstraße 9 – Gothic portal with coat of arms, from 1597
- Uferstraße/corner of Talstraße – grave cross fragment from 1653
- Uferstraße/corner of Breite Straße – Neoclassical garden pavilion, hipped roof, 1920s
- Valwiger Straße – Saint Remaclus's New Catholic Church (Neue Katholische Kirche St. Remaklus); quarrystone building, 1965–1968
- Valwiger Straße – wayside cross, from 1616
- Zehnthausstraße – winepress house; quarrystone building, partly timber-frame, 19th or 20th century
- Zehnthausstraße 18 – cadastral office; three-floor Expressionist plastered building, 1920s
- Zehnthausstraße 33 – timber-frame house, partly solid, plastered, essentially possibly from the 16th century
- Zehnthausstraße 56 – three-floor timber-frame house, partly solid, essentially from the 16th century
- Zehnthausstraße 73 – timber-frame house, partly solid, plastered, 18th century, no. 73 and 75, whole complex
- Zehnthausstraße 75 – timber-frame house, partly solid, plastered, mansard roof, 18th century, no. 73 and 75, whole complex
- Zehnthausstraße 77 – timber-frame house, partly solid, plastered, essentially from the 18th century
- Zehnthausstraße 83 – so-called Zehnthaus ("Tithe House"); former holding of the Stablo Monastery; timber-frame house, from 1615, outdoor staircase 1913
- Chapel with Stations of the Cross – quarrystone chapel, 19th century; Stations of the Cross, stele-type, from 1894
- Schuwerackerhof – chapel, within, Madonna, latter half of the 15th century; Saint Sebastian, earlier half of the 17th century; basalt wayside shrine (Bildstock), 1600, coat of arms
- Basalt wayside cross, from 1666

==== Sehl ====
- Alte Straße 14 – timber-frame house, partly solid, from 1686, knee wall and roof from the 19th century
- Alte Straße 18 – timber-frame house, partly solid, mansard roof, 18th century
- Brausestraße 8 – timber-frame house, partly solid, 17th century
- Ellerer Straße 18 – timber-frame façade, balloon frame, dendrochronologically dated to 1374
- Graveyard – two grave crosses, 1670, 17th century; warriors' memorial, sculptural group
- Josef-von-Lauff-Straße 38 – Villa Krain; timber-frame villa with several wings, partly solid, 1899–1900; whole complex with garden
- Saint Anthony's Chapel (Catholic; St.-Antonius-Kapelle); quire, latter half of the 15th century, aisleless church, 18th century
- Schulstraße – former school; quarrystone building, 1863
- Schulstraße 8 – abbot figure, 18th century (?)
- Sehler Anlagen 5 – quarrystone villa, about 1870
- On Bundesstraße 49, near Ebernach Monastery – wayside chapel with wayside cross, plastered building with wavy gable, 1676; niche cross, from 1629
- Near Ebernach Monastery – Weinbergshäuschen ("Little Vineyard House"); quarrystone building, partly timber-frame, 19th century
- Ebernach Monastery; former Benedictine monastery, mentioned in 1130; Catholic Chapel of the Assumption of Mary (Kapelle Mariae Himmelfahrt) – newer work includes Late Gothic quire, about 1437; outside: Crucifixion relief, 15th century; monastery: seven-axis building with mansard roof, from 1751, architect possibly Johannes Seiz; hospital: quarrystone building, from 1882; wayside chapel, quarrystone building, from 1904; whole complex with wayside chapel on Bundesstraße 49 (see there)

=== Other sightseeing ===
Other things worth seeing in Cochem include the Pinnerkreuz, a lookout point overlooking the town which can be reached by chairlift and the former Imperial castle (Reichsburg). There is also a promenade along the Moselle. Further points of interest are the historic Senfmühle ("Mustard Mill") and the water gauge house on the Moselle.

More detailed information about the castles and some of the ecclesiastical buildings mentioned above follows.

==== Cochem Imperial castle ====
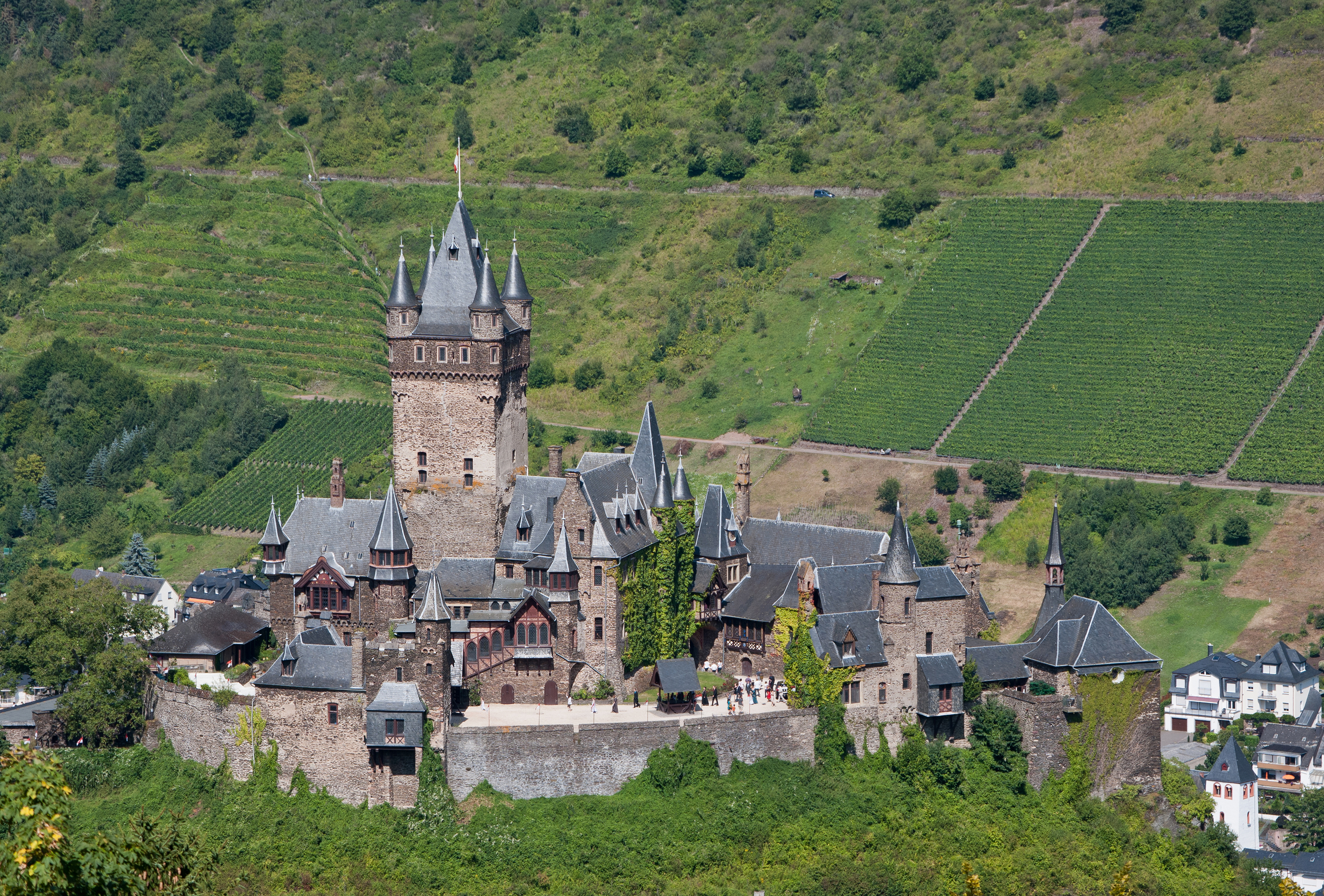
Reichsburg Cochem

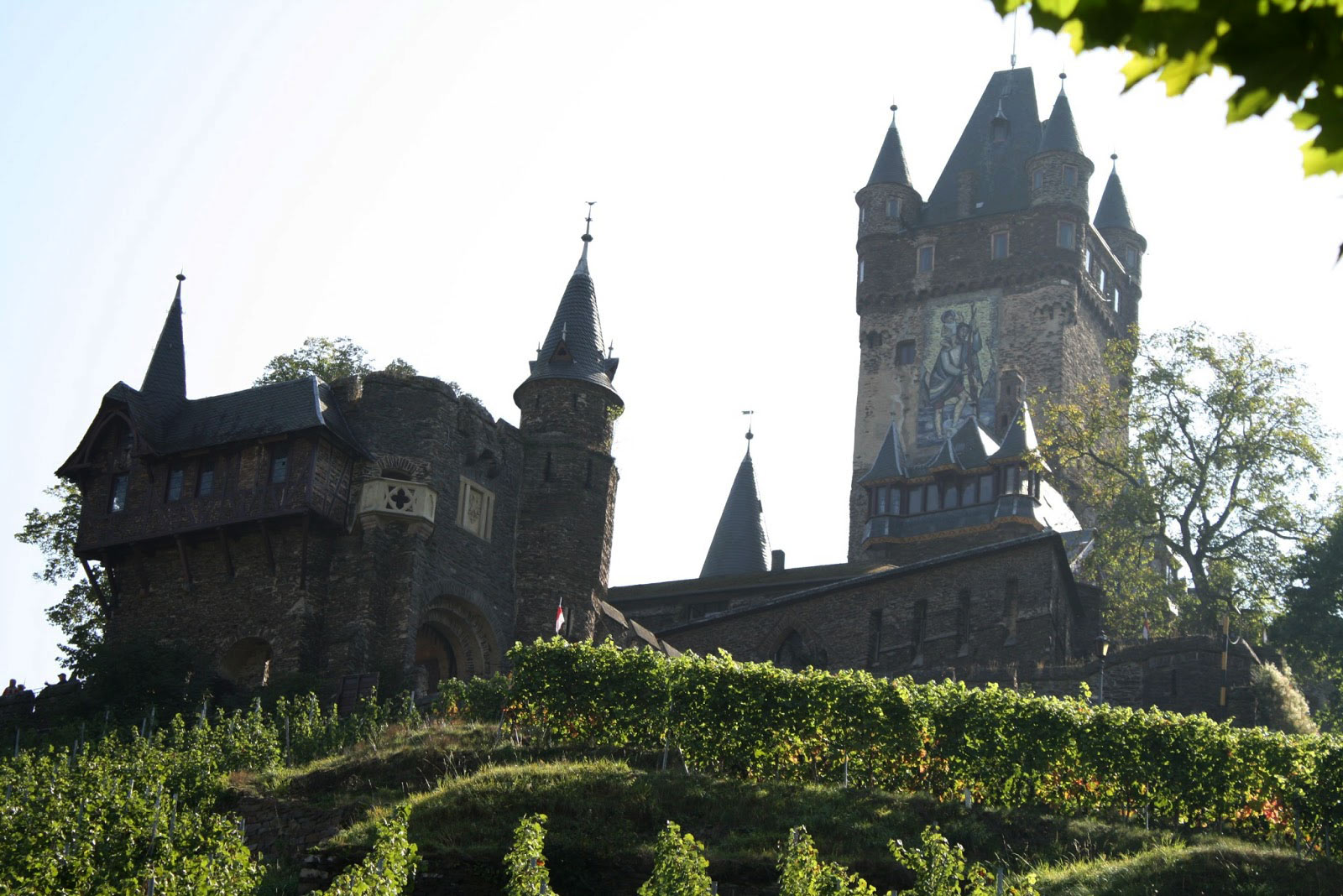
Vineyards at the Reichsburg Cochem

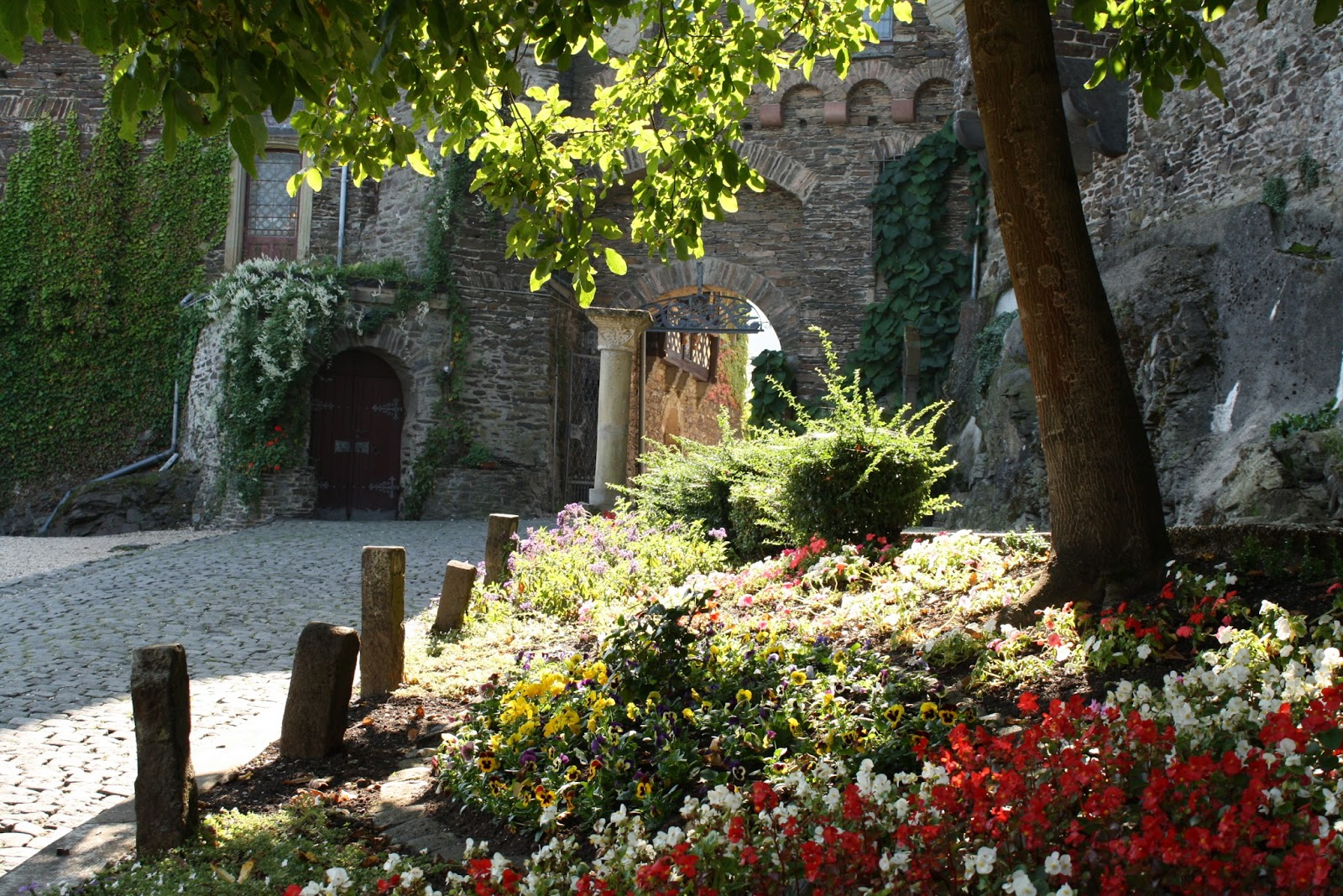
An inner court of the Reichsburg Cochem

The Reichsburg Cochem had its first documentary mention in 1130. In 1151, it was occupied by King Konrad III, who declared it an Imperial castle. In 1688, the castle was overrun by French King Louis XIV's troops in the course of the Nine Years' War (known in Germany as the Pfälzischer Erbfolgekrieg, or War of the Palatine Succession), and the following year, they destroyed it. The castle complex long lay in ruins before in 1868 it was bought by the Berlin businessman Louis Fréderic Jacques Ravené for 300 Goldmark and then reconstructed in the Gothic Revival style. Since 1978 it has been owned by the town of Cochem and is administered by a company named Reichsburg GmbH.

==== Winneburg castle ruin ====
The Winneburg was built in the latter half of the 13th century. It had its first documentary mention in 1304 as belonging to a one Wirich von Wunnenberg. In the centuries that followed, the castle complex was steadily expanded while all the while remaining within the ownership of the Lords of Wunnenberg (later Winneburg). After this noble family died out in 1637, the castle passed to the family Metternich. In 1689, during the Nine Years' War, the castle was besieged, taken and blown up by French troops. It was never restored, and remains in ruins to this day. It was, however, bought in 1832 by Prince von Metternich, but no reconstruction ever came about. Since 1932, it has been owned by the town of Cochem.

==== Saint Roch's Plague Chapel ====
The Pestkapelle St. Rochus, also known as the Peterskapelle seems to have had its groundwork laid in the time when Archbishop Otto von Ziegenhain waived Cochem's customary taxes and levies for ten years on the occasion of the Plague. It is described in an engraving by Braun and Hogenberg as S. Pettersberg. Standing next to a small, rectangular chapel was a hostel. It is also possible that the red sandstone keystone set above the west portal comes from this time. Despite heavy weathering, a high relief of a Madonna sitting on clouds, with Child, framed with a Zweipass, can be made out. In 1666, the Plague came once again to Cochem. This might well have been the reason why Philipp Emmerich von Winneburg and Dietrich Adolf von Metternich endowed a new building for the parish in 1680. With this new building, the Plague saint, Roch, came to the fore as the chapel's namesake. The wooden altar from 1682 shows the two men's coat of arms. A notice on the back names Michael Luter for a new setting in 1820. The central altar image is a glorification of Mary that sweeps over the representatives of the spiritual (pope, abbots, members of orders, priests) and worldly (emperors, kings, bishops) estates. Seen above her is the Holy Trinity with the Father, the Son and the Holy Ghost, and beside her are Death with the hourglass, and an angel with banners bearing doxologies and quotations from psalms. A cartouche above the central altar shows Saint "Anthony with Child". On the uppermost part of the altar, on an open gable, is Saint Peter with a key and a book. Originally, the chapel's ornamentation included images of Mary Magdalene, Saint Roch, Saint Sebastian, the holy bishop Nicholas and another statue of Roch. Saint Roch's dog was even depicted in the middle of the ceiling in a half-relief. Among the chapel's adornments was once a chandelier, which has since been stolen. It was a wall fixture in the shape of an arm dressed with a short sleeve.

==== Sehler Dom St. Antonius Abbas ====
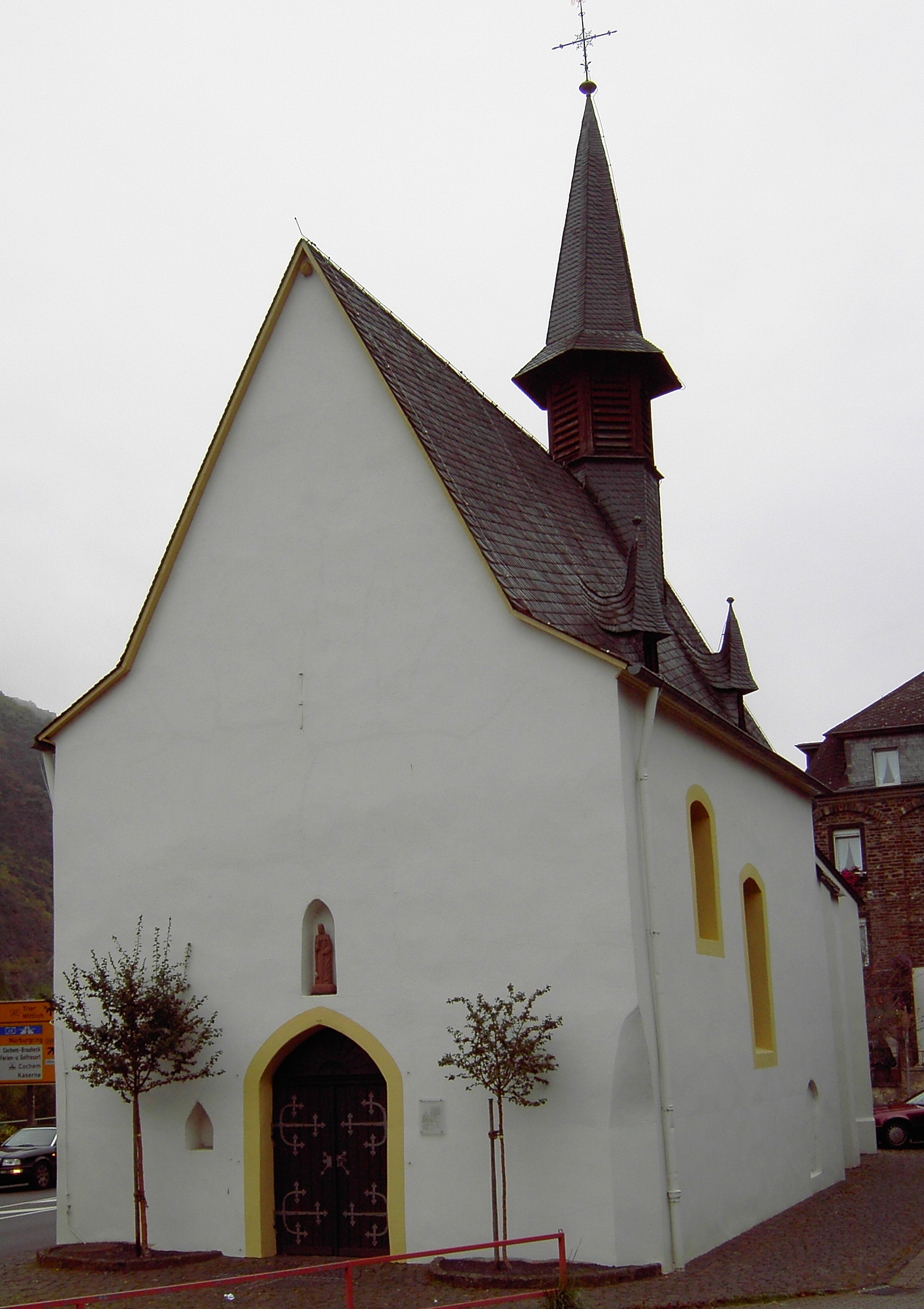
Sehler Dom St. Antonius Abbas

In 1493, the parish of Cochem was granted leave to build a new chapel in Sehl on the bank of the Moselle. There had already been a chapel in Sehl, but its whereabouts are now unknown. Financing for the new chapel was made possible by Pope Alexander VI's and Archbishop of Trier Johann II of Baden's (1456–1503) indulgence privileges. Of this chapel, the quire still stands today, filled out by the west portal built in 1915. The chapel was consecrated to the abbot and local resident Antonius, bishop Wolfgang (depictions of whom are to be found used as keystones together with Archbishop Johann's coat of arms), the Madonna, bishop Ruprecht and the virgin Cunen. Each Tuesday and Thursday, a mass was to be said in the chapel by the Cochem pastor, for which the chapel would yearly receive 6 Gulden and 24 Weißpfennig in Cochem currency. For that, the hay from Sehl's meadows, bordering on the chapel, was pledged. Sehlers were "half-townsmen" of Cochem without their own municipal rights, and the Cochem town council at first spoke out against the move to bring a bell to the so-called Sehler Dom ("Sehl Cathedral"). The chapel later got one that was cast in 1441. It bears the inscription "AVE MARIA GRACIA PLENA DOMINUS TECUM MCCCCXXXXI" ("Hail Mary, full of grace – the Lord [is] with thee – 1441"). Found here today is a "Mary under the Cross" from the early 16th century, a gift from Dean Eckert to Saint Martin's.

==== Chapel at the Three Crosses ====
On an open spot between Cochem and Sehl in the traditional cadastral area known as Im Haag at some crags, the Kapelle Zu den drei Kreuzen ("Chapel at the Three Crosses") offers an impressive view into the Moselle valley. The building of the first chapel on this spot may well stem, like the Crucifixion group that stands before it, from an endowment made in 1652 in Elector of Trier Karl Casper von der Leyen's time. There is a corresponding year in soft sandstone mounted in the middle of the otherwise basalt cross. Two tau crosses, today lacking the former thief figures that once hung on them, still flank the middle cross. Carved into the left one are the master's initials, P.A. In the mid 19th century, the first chapel had fallen into such disrepair that then master builder Joseph Dalmar Senior's advice was sought. The chapel's condition, however, made any renovation impossible. So, Dalmar instead put forth a plan for a new building, along with a cost estimate. It was financed through donations from the Cochem townsfolk themselves. Besides the many small ones, there was also a big one of more than ten Thaler. To raise more monies to defray the building costs for the new chapel, a raffle was held. Offered as a prize was a pair of slippers, which was won by Captain Sabel. This raffle yielded a further ten Thaler, making it possible to complete the new chapel by 1850. Dalmar planned it to be built three metres farther back into the slope. The land needed for this was donated by the family Bauer. There were further expenses, such as those for roof boards and slates. The "Throne of Mercy" (Gnadenstuhl in German) from the 16th century that was originally found here now stands in the "Old Quire" at Saint Martin's.

==== Saint Remaclus's Parish Church ====
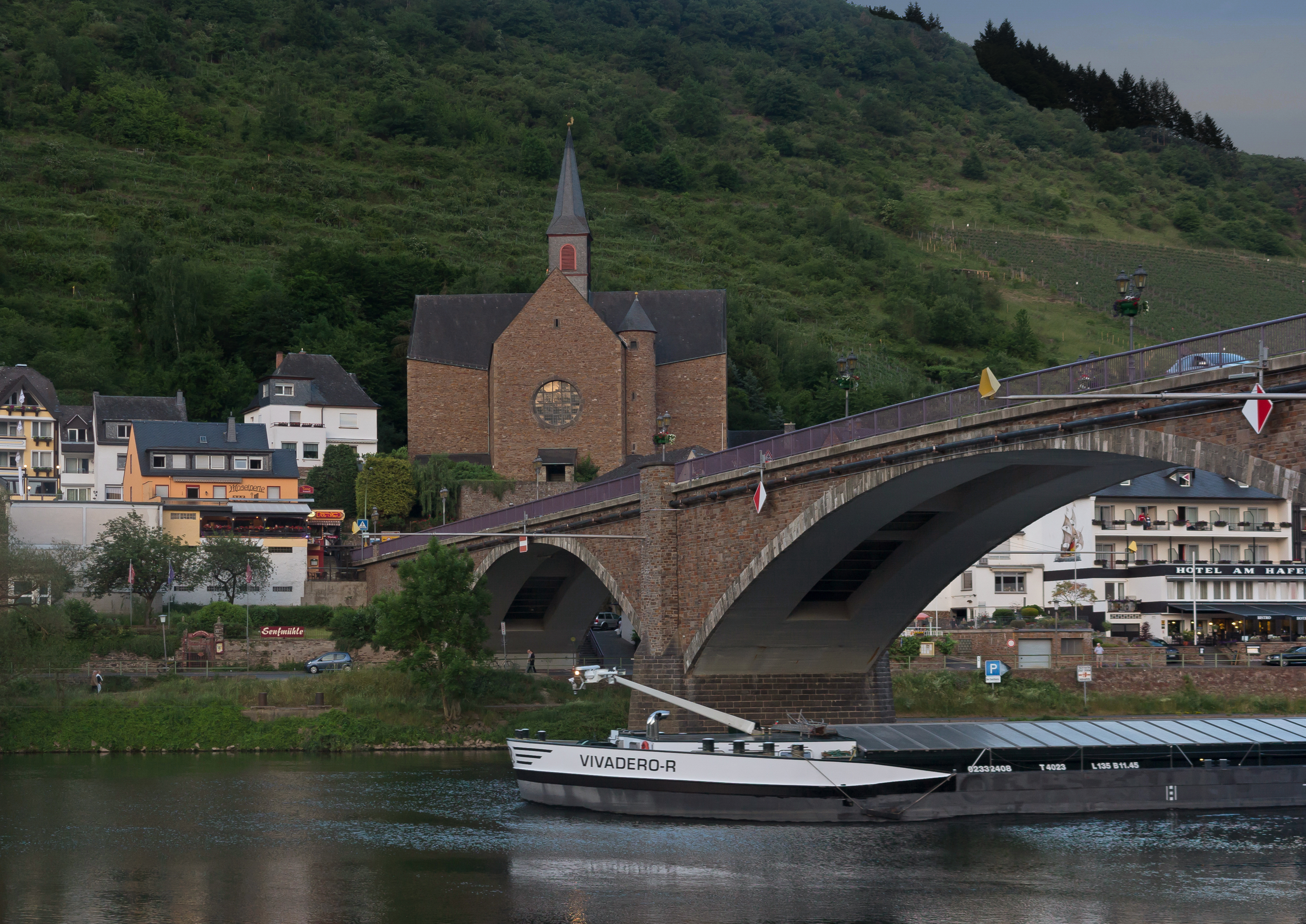
Cochem, catholic church (Kirche Sankt Remaklus) and the bridge (Skagerrakbrücke)

Despite being constructed from local materials (such as slate quarrystones) and in a similar style to the older, surrounding buildings, Saint Remaclus's, located in the outlying centre of Cond, was built relatively recently (1964–1967).

According to the plan conceived by master church builder Emil Steffann (1899–1968), the building was meant to serve as a bridgehead and a counterpoint to the castle over on the other side of the river. The space is designed for openness: for the liturgical implementation after the Second Vatican Council, and for the congregation around the altar. The cross-shaped space is surrounded by whitewashed brick walls, punctuated by large round windows. Large circular arches expand on the cross's three upper arms from the pews to the altar position before the deep-set apse. A huge wheel-shaped chandelier hangs over the pews and the chancel.

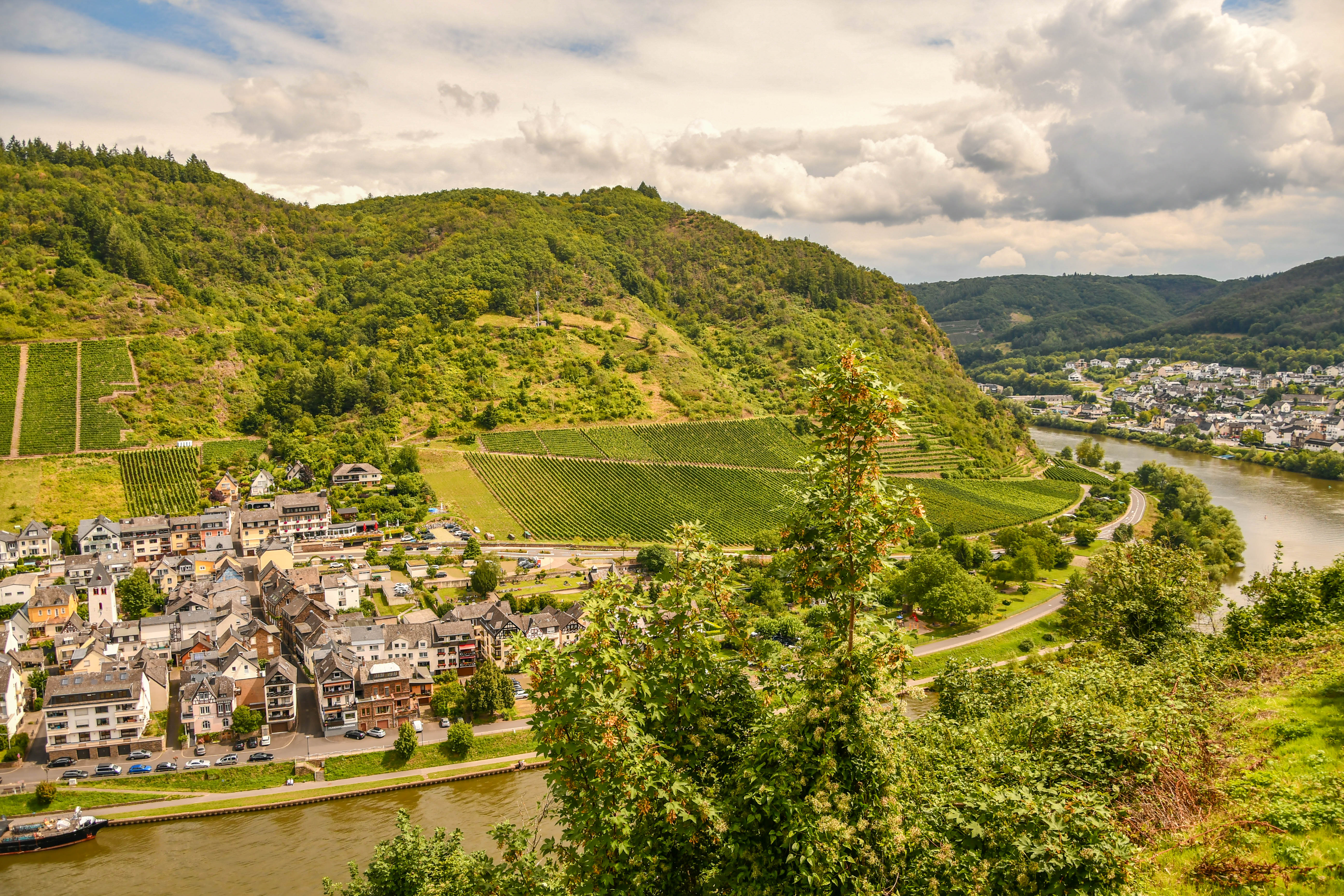
Cochem

The ornamentation has been consciously reduced to a few very valuable, restored images and figures from the old, and now demolished, parish church, and to conservatively wrought artworks by contemporary artists. These include the foundation stone and keystone in the crypt's barrel vaulting by Jochem Pechau, the tabernacle in the crypt by Klaus Balke, the forged grille by Paul Nagel, the lead glass window in the apse by Jakob Schwarzkopf and the ambo, the eternal flame and the altar candleholder by Christoph Anders. The church is opened at all service times.

==== Bundesbank-Bunker Cochem ====
In 1962, Deutsche Bundesbank built a secret bunker in Cochem-Cond, 30 meters underground, disguised by two houses of the training and recreation center of Bundesbank. The bunker's vault held a reserve series of German mark banknotes totaling 15 billion marks during the Cold War, intended to enter circulation in case the Eastern Bloc would try to cripple West German economy by massively counterfeiting the existing DM banknotes. To open the vault, bank officials from Frankfurt would have to bring over three different keys and a lock combination.

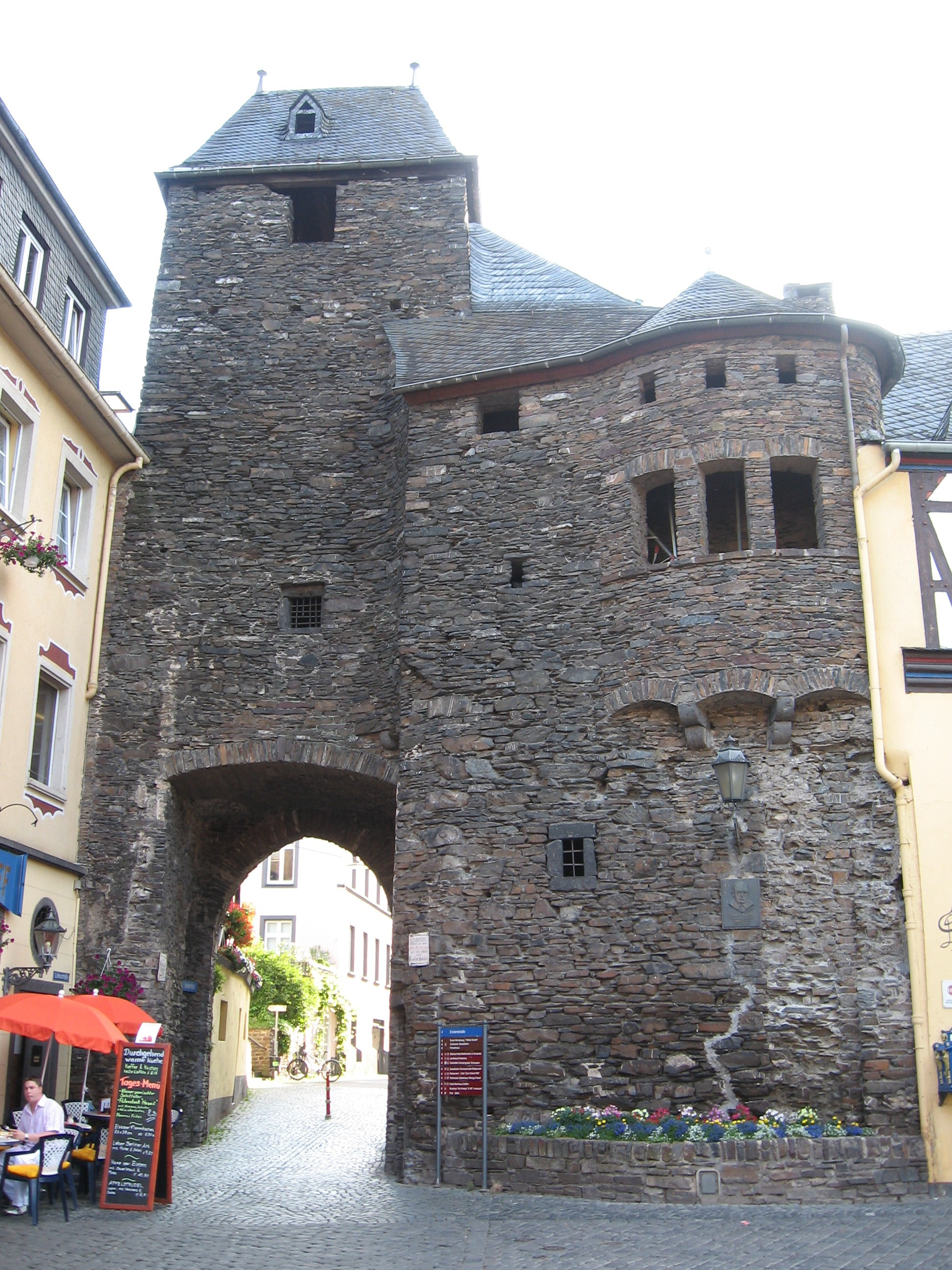
Enderttor

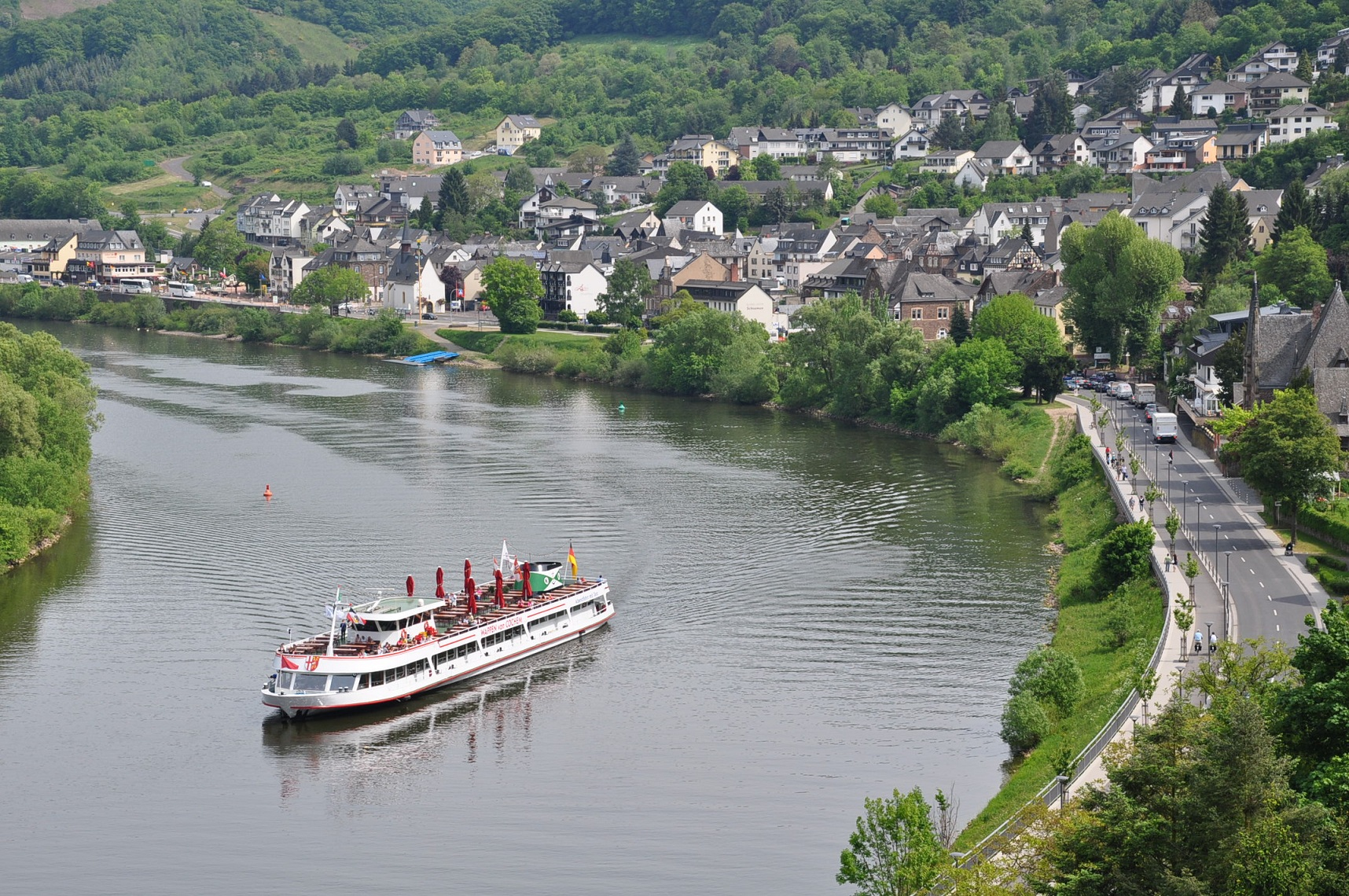
Sehl, with riverboat

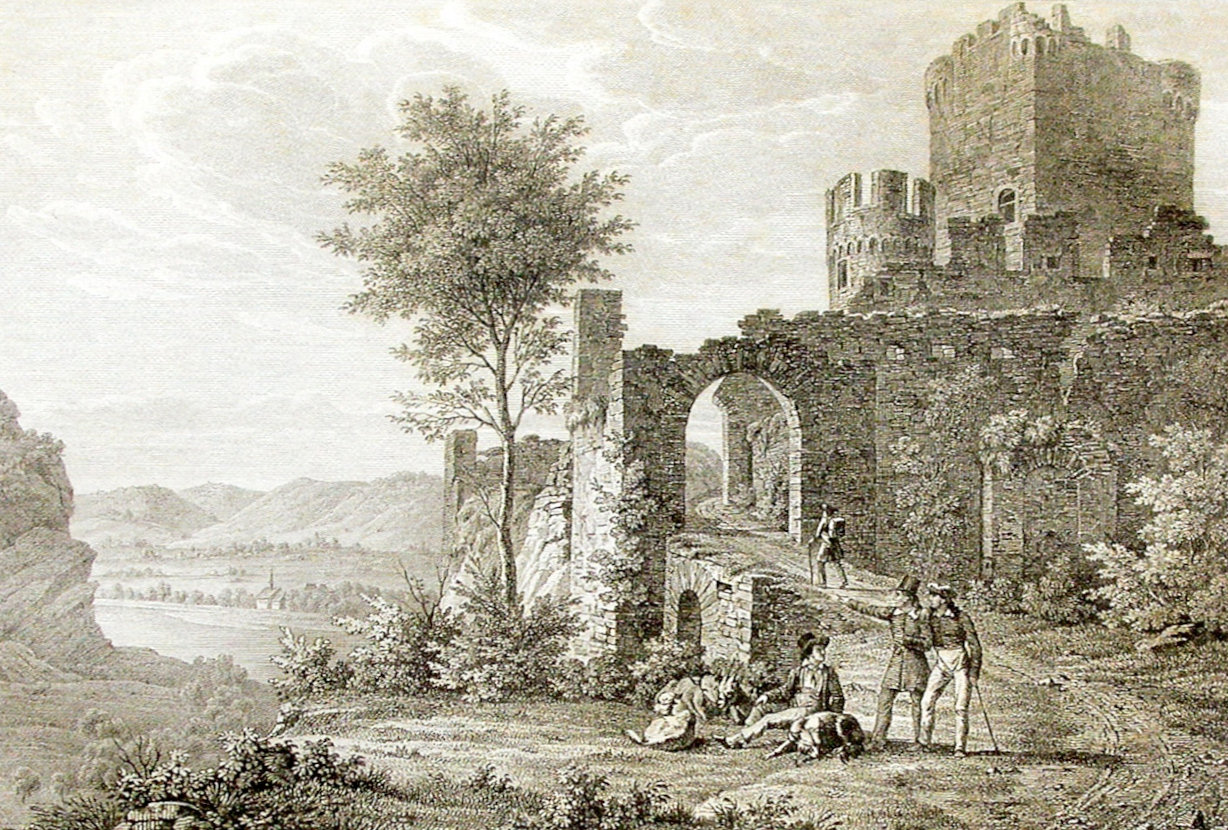
Cochem Imperial castle ruin (seen from the north), before 1822, after a drawing by Christian Xeller

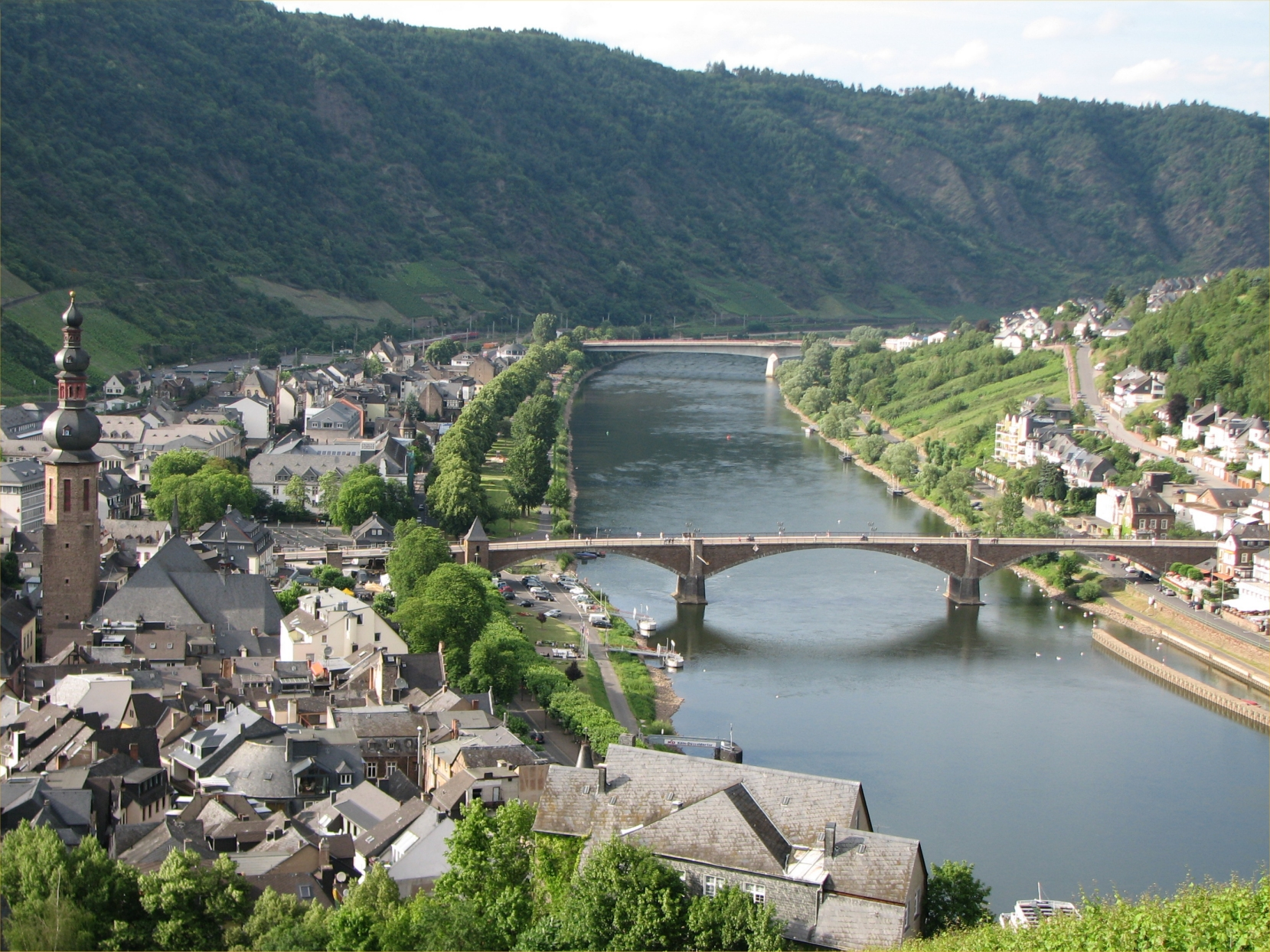
Cochem, seen from the castle

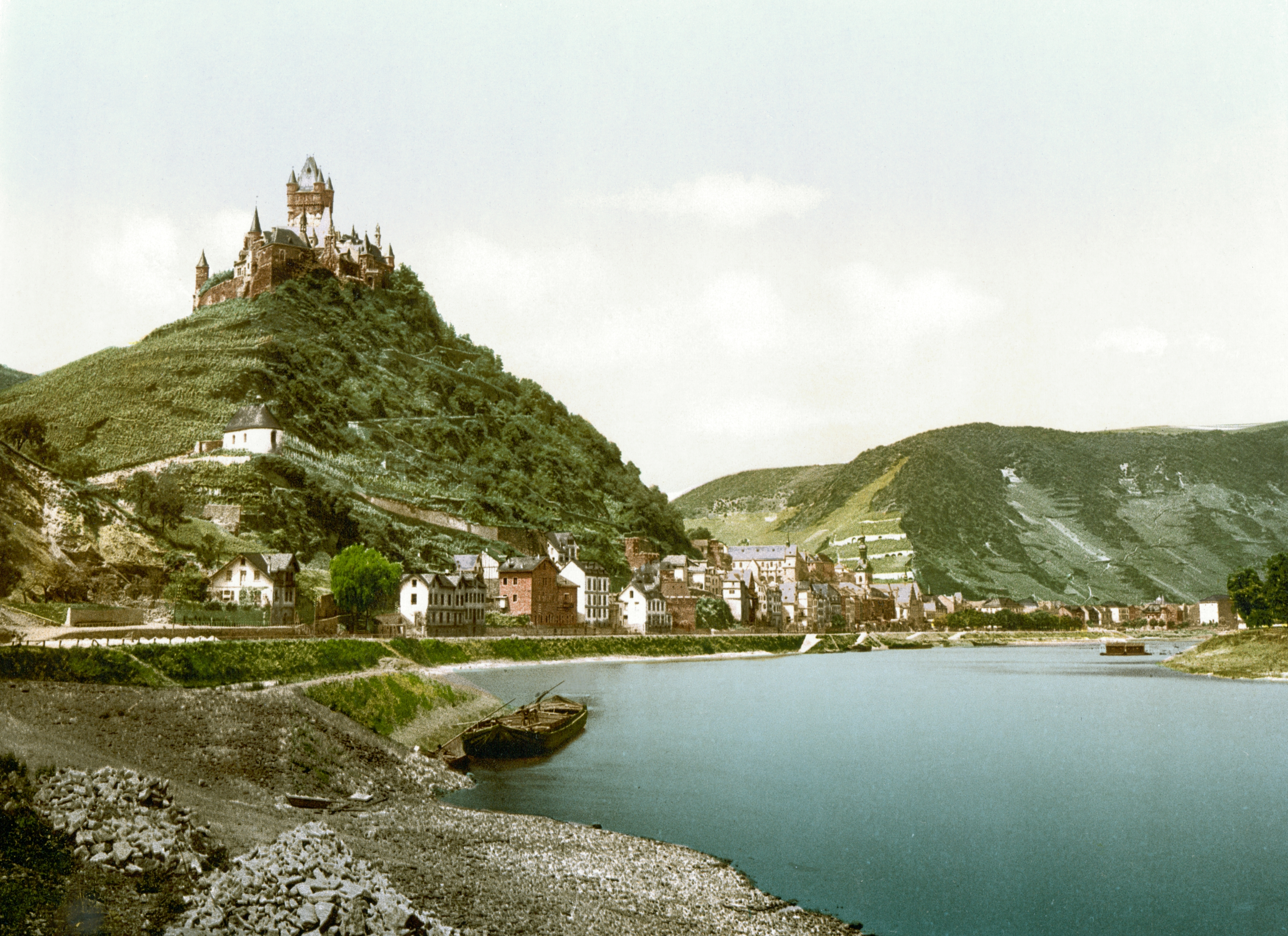
Cochem Castle between 1890 and 1905

=== Natural monuments ===
Cochemer Krampen

At Cochem, the Cochemer Krampen, a 24-kilometre-long stretch of the Moselle made up of many winding bows beginning upstream at Bremm, comes to an end.

Above the Imperial castle is found the Lescherlinde, a limetree which, owing to its great age of more than 550 years – it can even be clearly recognized up on the mountain from Cochem railway station – holds the status of Natural Monument.

Above the outlying centre of Cond lies the Brauselay Nature Conservation Area, which has Mediterranean vegetation. Not far from Cochem, down the Moselle from the village of Klotten, is found the Dortebachtal Nature Conservation Area, a place well worth a hike for its scenery.

== Economy and infrastructure ==
The town of Cochem is characterized by winegrowing and tourism, even if their economic importance has been waning over the past few decades. Important tourism sites are the Reichsburg Cochem (Cochem Imperial castle), the Freizeitzentrum Cochem (leisure centre) in the outlying centre of Cond, the nearby Wild- und Freizeitpark Klotten ("Klotten Wilderness and Leisure Park") and the Ediger-Eller holiday and golf resort up in the Eifel heights. A majority of the inhabitants, though, can now be found employed in other branches of the economy. There are fewer than ten full-time winegrowing businesses.

=== Transport ===
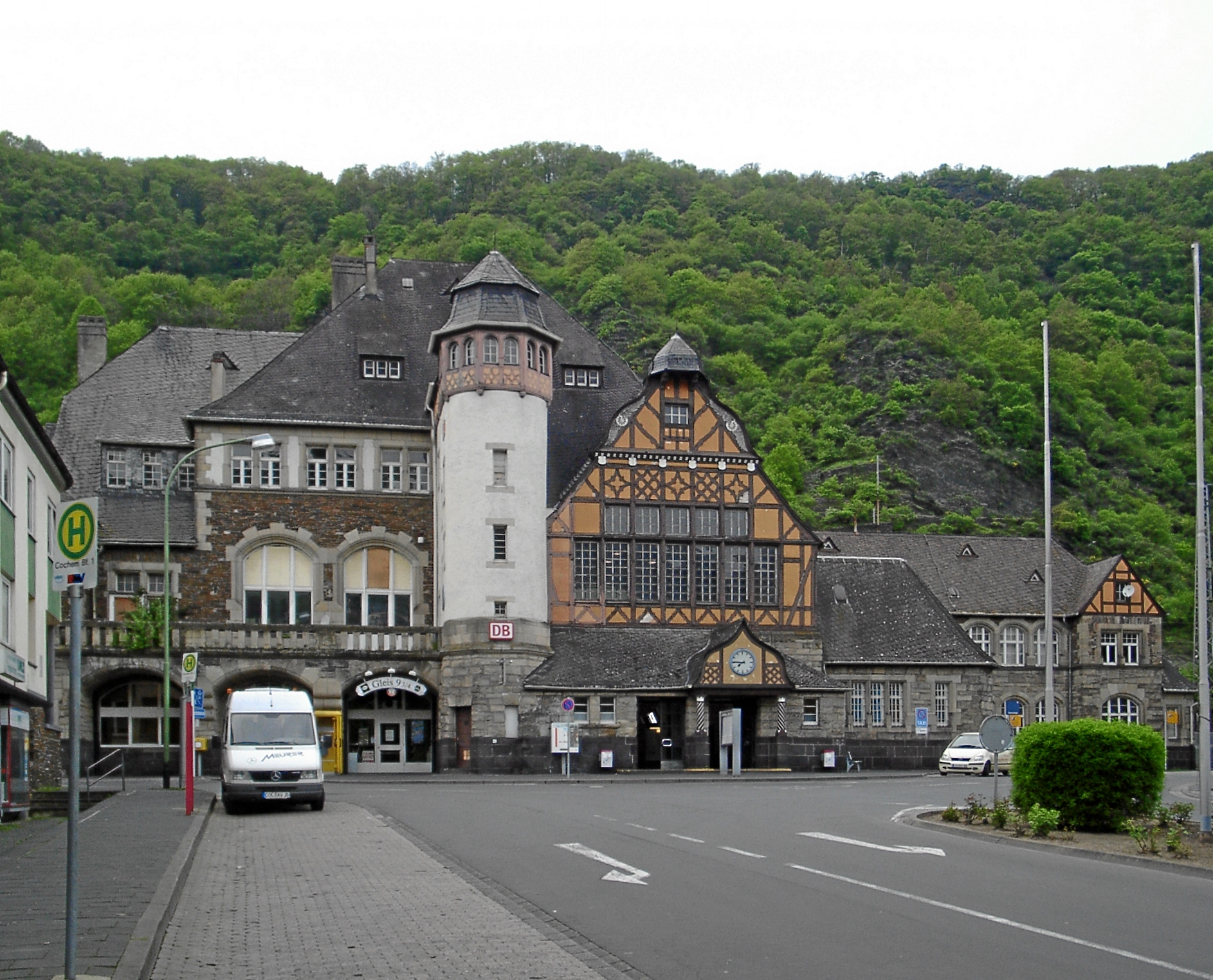
Cochem Railway Station is of importance to architectural history.

The town lies on the Koblenz–Trier line, which between Cochem and Ediger-Eller runs through the Kaiser-Wilhelm-Tunnel, which from its completion in 1877 until 1887 was Germany's longest tunnel at 4.2 km (3 mi). Calling at the station are Regionalbahn, Regional-Express and InterCity trains, along with one ICE train each morning and evening affording a morning-evening link with Berlin. Moreover, there are a few regional buslines. The town belongs to the Verkehrsverbund Rhein-Mosel ("Rhine-Moselle Transport Association"). The nearest airports to the town are Hahn Airport, located 41 km (25 mi) north, Cologne Bonn Airport, located 112 km (70 mi) north, Luxembourg Airport, located 132 km (82 mi) north east and Frankfurt Airport, located 159 km (99 mi) east of Cochem.

=== Public institutions ===
The town is a Bundeswehr location (TUK Cochem-Brauheck) and an administrative and educational centre. Cochem is the administrative seat of the Verbandsgemeinde of Cochem and the Cochem-Zell district. Located in Cochem are an Amt court, an employment office, a branch office of the Wasser- und Schifffahrtsamt Koblenz-Mosel ("Koblenz-Moselle Water and Ship Transport Office"), a health unit, the district waterworks, a police station and the water safety police station, a hospital, two seniors' residences, a home for those with mental handicaps (at Ebernach Monastery), a German Red Cross and Wasserwacht rescue station and a well equipped fire brigade.

=== Education ===
Cochemer Platt (local dialect)

- Grundschule Cochem (primary school)
- Hauptschule Cochem
- Realschule Cochem
- Martin-von-Cochem-Gymnasium
- Berufsbildende Schule Cochem-Zell (vocational college)
  - Berufsvorbereitungsjahr gewerblich-technischen sowie hauswirtschaftlichen Bereich (preparatory year in commercial-technical and budgetary fields)
  - Berufsschule (professional school with 30 subject areas)
  - Berufsfachschule I (BF I) (technical school I with 7 subject areas)
  - Berufsfachschule II (BF II) (technical school II)
  - Zweijährige Höhere Berufsfachschule (two-year higher technical school)
  - Berufsoberschule I (BOS I) (upper professional school I)
  - Duale Berufsoberschule (DBOS) (dual upper professional school)
  - Berufsoberschule II (BOS II) (upper professional school II)
  - Fachschule (school for geriatric nursing and tourism)
- Kreisvolkshochschule (KVHS) Cochem/Zell (district folk high school)

=== Clubs ===
- Aktive Cochemer Jugend (ACJ, youth)
- Brauhecker Boule Club (BBC, boules)
- Behindertensportgruppe Fortuna Ebernach (disabled sports)
- Caritasverband für die Region Mosel-Eifel-Hunsrück e. V., Cochem chapter (Caritas)
- Cochemer Bürgerwehr e. V. (vigilance committee)
- Cochemer Karnevalsgesellschaft 1849 e. V. (CKG, Carnival)
- Cochemer Rudergesellschaft 1905 e. V. (rowing)

Deutsche Lebens-Rettungs-Gesellschaft (DLRG), Cochem chapter

- Deutscher Amateur-Radio-Club (DARC), Cochem chapter
- Deutsches Rotes Kreuz (DRK), Cochem chapter (German Red Cross)
- Freiwillige Feuerwehr Cochem mit Jugendfeuerwehr Cochem (volunteer fire brigade with youth wing)
- Gastlichkeit & Tourismus e. V. (hospitality and tourism)
- Möhnenverein Cochem ("women fools", a Carnival club)
- Musikverein Cochem e. V. (music)
- Reservistenkameradschaft Cochemer Land ("reservist comradeship")
- Schachclub Cochem 1973 e. V. (chess)
- Schützengesellschaft Cochem 1847 e. V. (shooting sports)
- Sehler Quetschefest Verein e. V.
- Spielvereinigung Cochem 1912 e. V. (playing union)
- Technisches Hilfswerk (THW), Cochem chapter
- Tanzgruppe "Moselglück" (dancing)
- Turnverein Eintracht 1862 Cochem e. V. (gymnastics)
- Wasserwacht Cochem
- Winneburger Tross

== Famous people ==
- von Cochem, knightly and Ministerial family, 1130–1353
- Emecho II von Cochem (1336–1401), abbot at Brauweiler
- Vinzenz Mohr (1475–1525), Benedictine priest, abbot at Trier
- Pater Martin of Cochem (1634–1712), priest in a religious order
- Conradus von Cochem (1650–1717), abbot at St. Pathaleon in Cologne
- Carl Joseph Friedrichs (1831–1916), printer, author and gold prospector
- Barbara Kemp (1881–1959), soprano and opera singer
- Maria Weinand (1882–1960), educator and writer
- Josef Steib (1898–1957), painter and etcher, died in Cochem
- Willi Werner Macke (1914–1985), chief mayor of Koblenz 1960–1972
- Carl-Fritz Nicolay (1922–1997), artist, died in Cochem
- Rudolf Steinberg (born 1943), legal scientist
- Horst Föhr (born 1944), business executive
- Werner Weidenfeld (born 1947), political scientist
- Ernst Heimes (born 1956), writer and cabaret artist
- Heike Raab (born 1965), politician
- Joy Vogelsang, actor Nicolas Cage's mother

== Further images ==
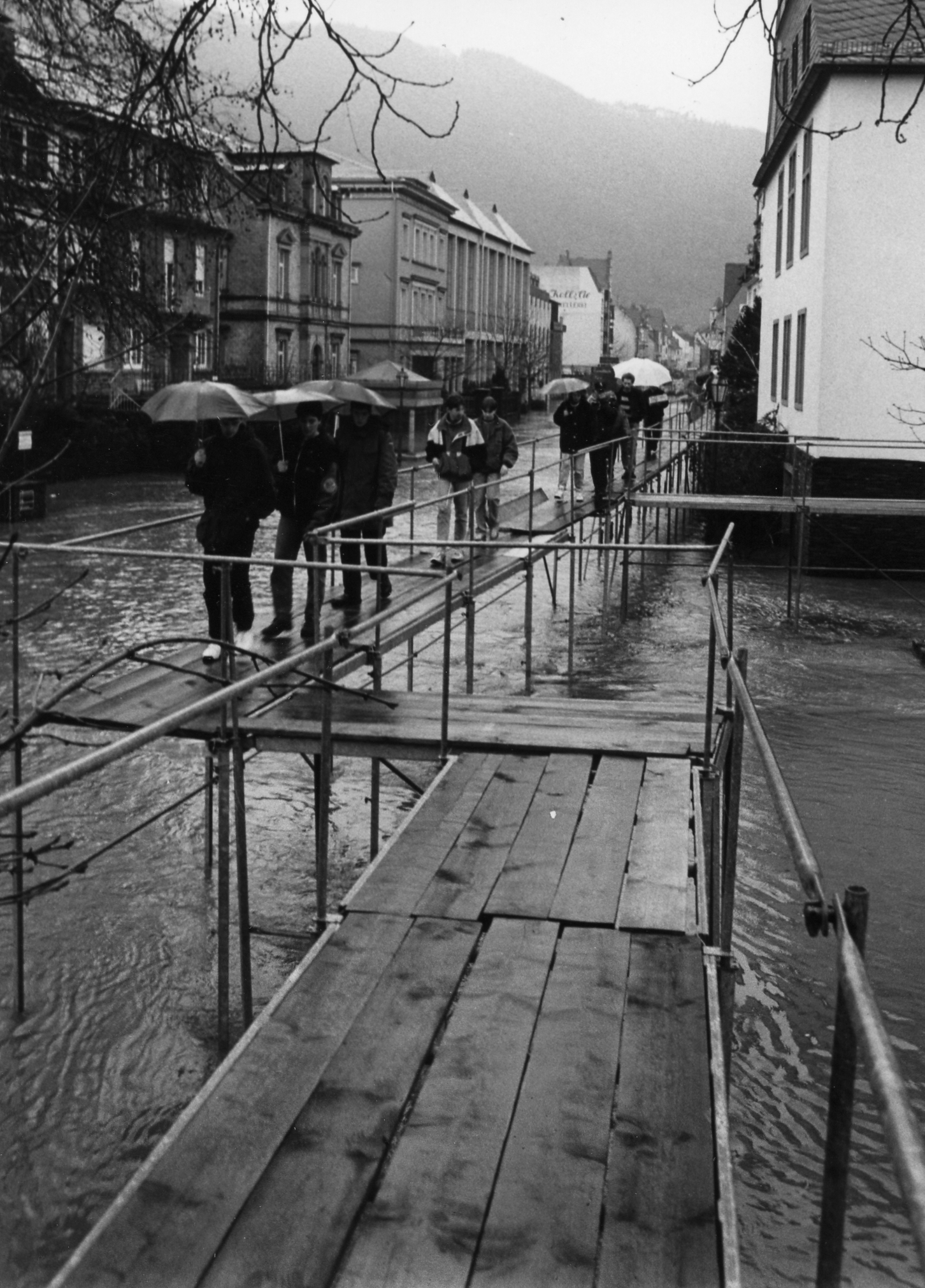
Duckboards on Ravenéstraße during flooding

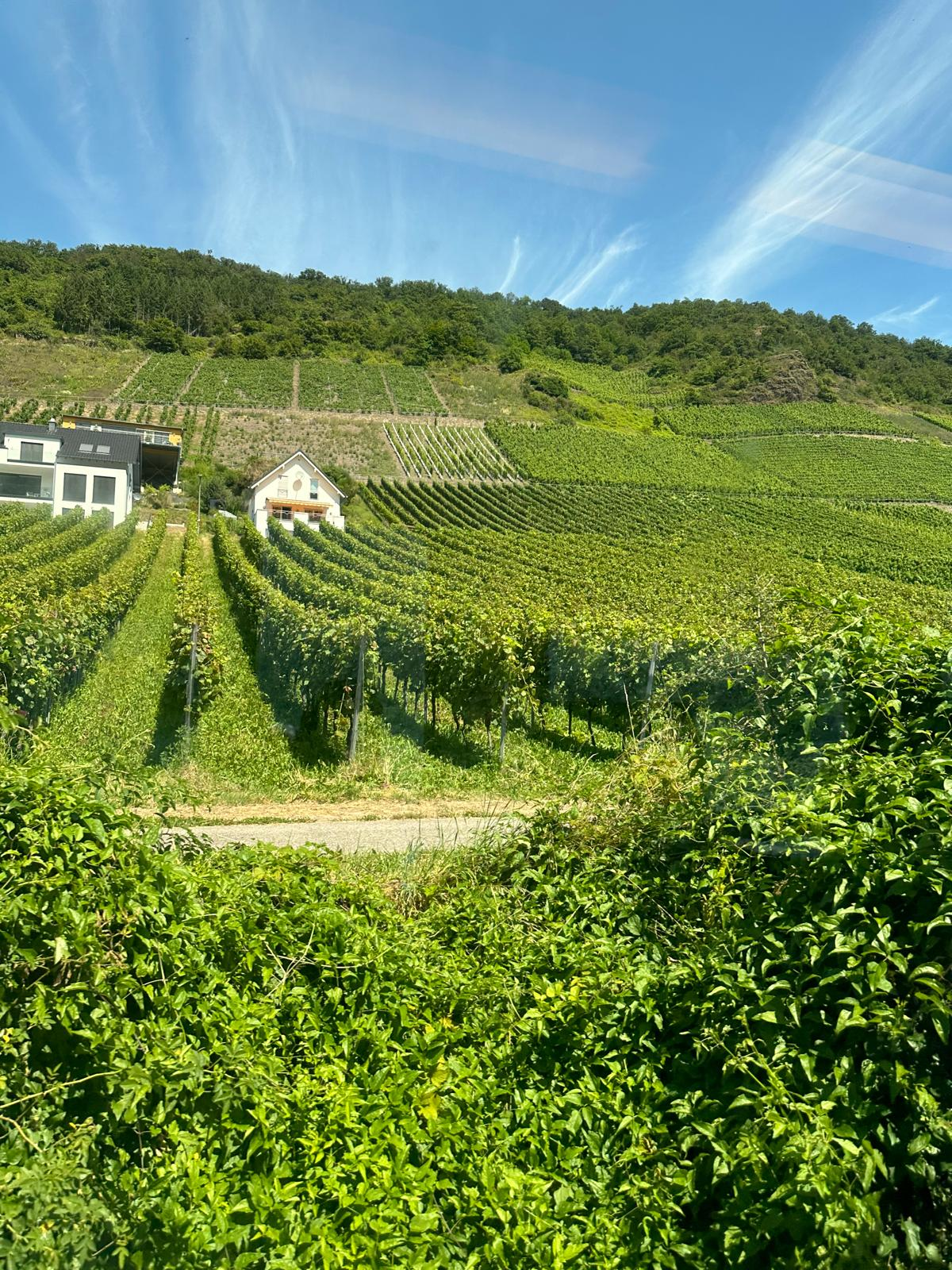
Vineyard near Cochem
