= Gate City =

Gate City can mean:

- Gate City, Virginia, a city in Scott County, Virginia
  - Gate City Historic District, a national historic district located at Gate City, Scott County, Virginia
- Gate City, a park in Ōsaki, Tokyo
- Gate City, a newly developed ring city near Almaty, Kazakhstan
- Gate City Bank, mutually owned bank headquartered in Fargo, North Dakota,
- Gate City FC, an earlier American soccer club based in Greensboro, North Carolina

== City nicknames ==
- the nickname of Pocatello, Idaho
- the nickname of Nashua, New Hampshire
- the nickname of Greensboro, North Carolina
- a historic nickname for Atlanta, Georgia

== See also ==
- City Gate (disambiguation)
