= Martin city gate =

Coordinates: 50°08′33″N 7°10′05″E

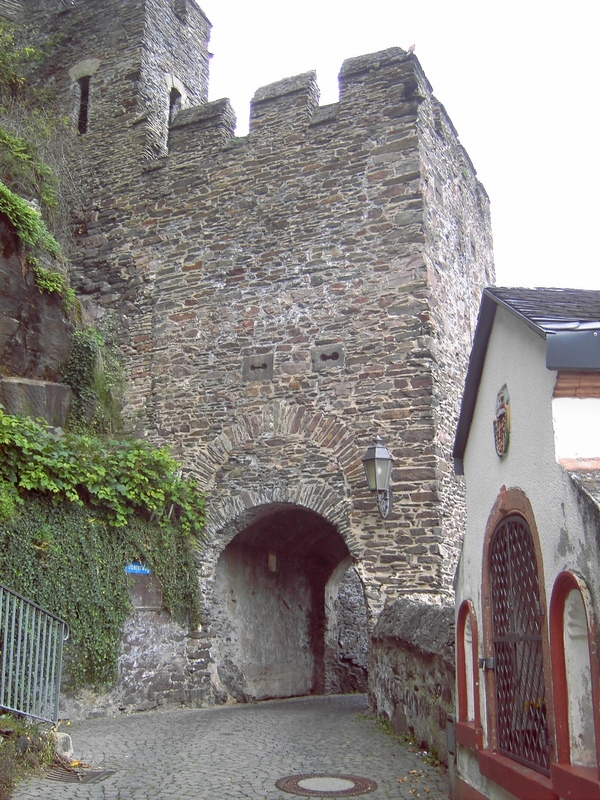
Martin city gate

The Martin city gate is one of three still-existing city gates of the German city of Cochem.

== History ==
The Martin city gate was built in 1352 according to an order of the elector Baldwin of Luxembourg, Archbishop of Trier. It was built as a toll house. A chain connecting the city gate with the opposite border of the river Mosel could stop ships trying to escape their duty of paying taxes.

Later on, a new owner, Louis Ravené, created a storing room for ice in the small tower of the city gate.
