= City Gate (Warsaw) =

Skyscraper in Warsaw, Poland

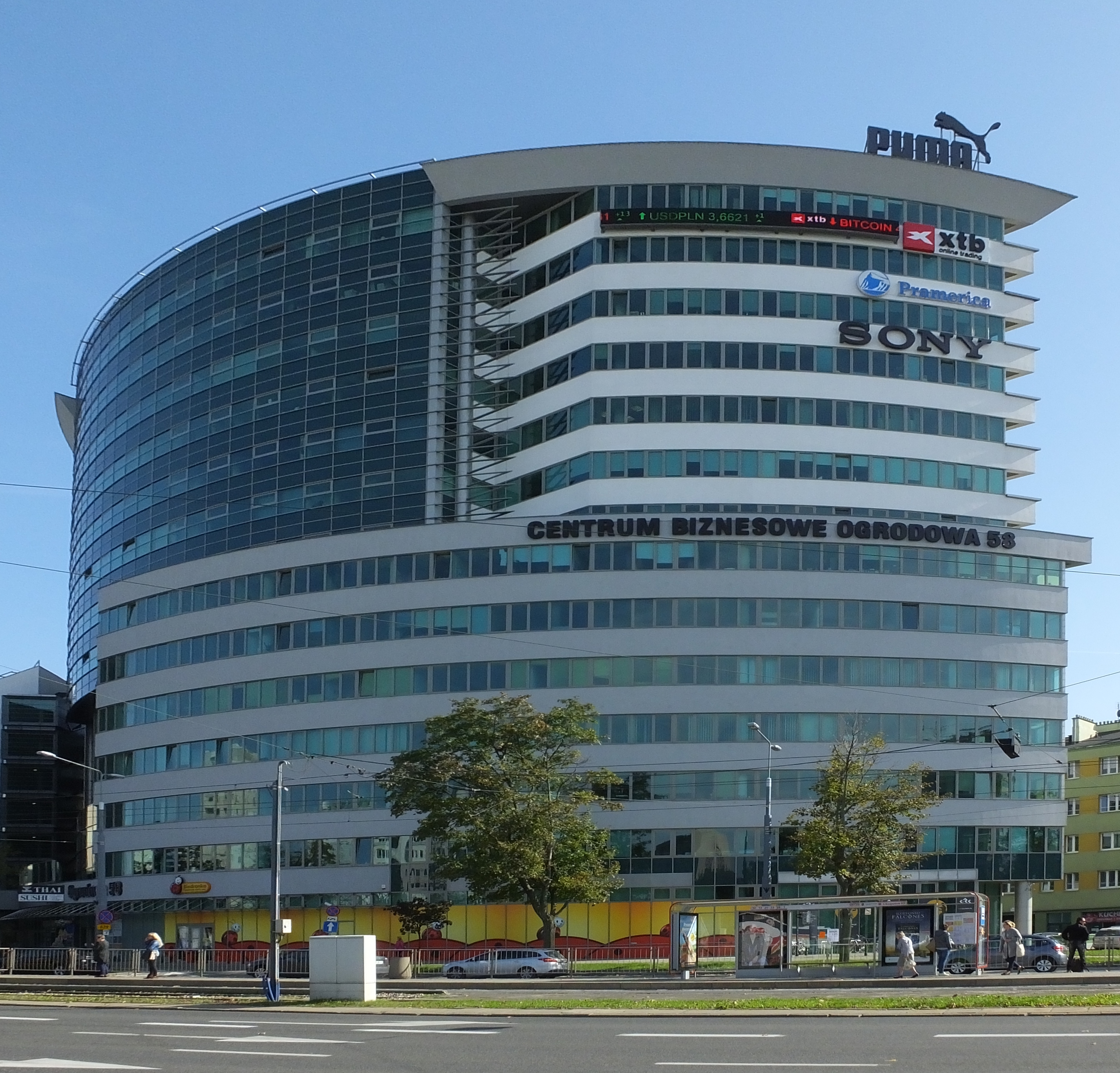
- The building as seen from Solidarity Avenue in 2017.

General information
- Type: Office building
- Location: 58 Ogrodowa Street, Wola, Warsaw, Masovian Voivodeship, Poland
- Coordinates: 52°14′33″N 20°58′58.56″E
- Construction started: 1997
- Completed: 2000
- Owner: Tower Inwestycje

Technical details
- Floor count: 14
- Floor area: 26,205 m^{2} (282,068.27 sq ft)

Design and construction
- Architects: Roman Abramczuk; Adam Tyliszczak
- Developer: Echo Investment

The City Gate, formerly known as Skwer Wolski (Polish: [ˈskfɛr ˈvɔl.ski]; lit. 'Wola Square'), is an office building in the city of Warsaw in Masovian Voivodeship, Poland. It is located located at 58 Ogrodowa Street, in the neighbourhood of Mirów within the Wola district.

== History ==
The building was designed by architects Adam Tyliszczak and Roman Abramczuk, and was constructed between 1997 and November 2000. It was developed by Echo Investment and acquired by Tower Inwestycje, a subsidiary of Powszechny Zakład Ubezpieczeń. In 2026, the management of the office spaces in the building was relegated to the company The Shire.

== Characteristics ==
The skyscraper consists of two parts, consisting of 14 and 7 storeys, respectively. It also includes2 underground levels dedicated to a car park with 230 spaces. The building has the total floor area of 26,205 m^{2} (282,068.27 sq ft), of which 19,000 m^{2} (204,514.3 ft) is dedicated to office spaces, and 1,350 m^{2} (14,531.28) to stores and services.

== Gallery ==
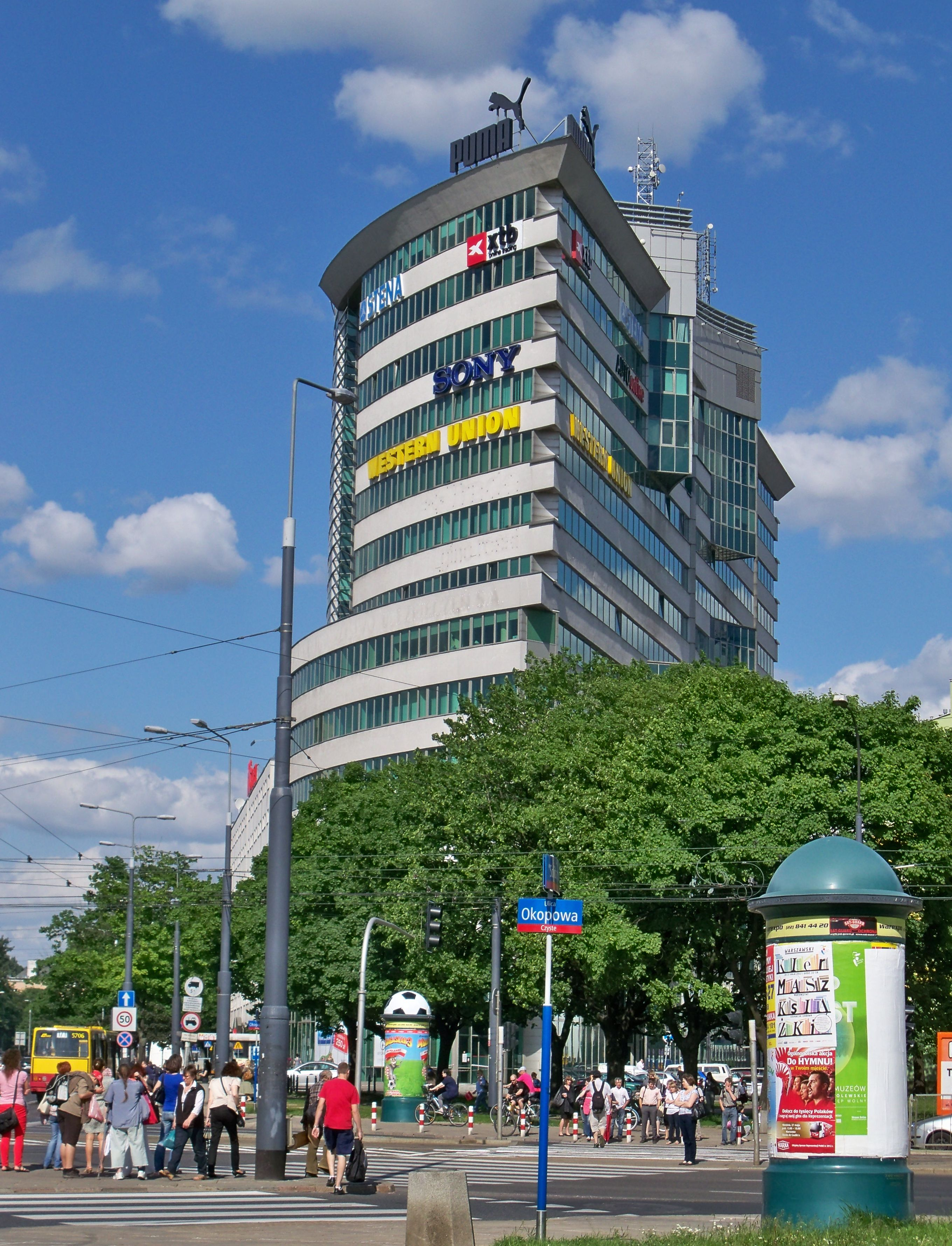
The building as seen from the intersection of Okopowa Street and Solidarity Avenue in 2012.
