= Werner Müller-Esterl =

German biochemist (born 1948)

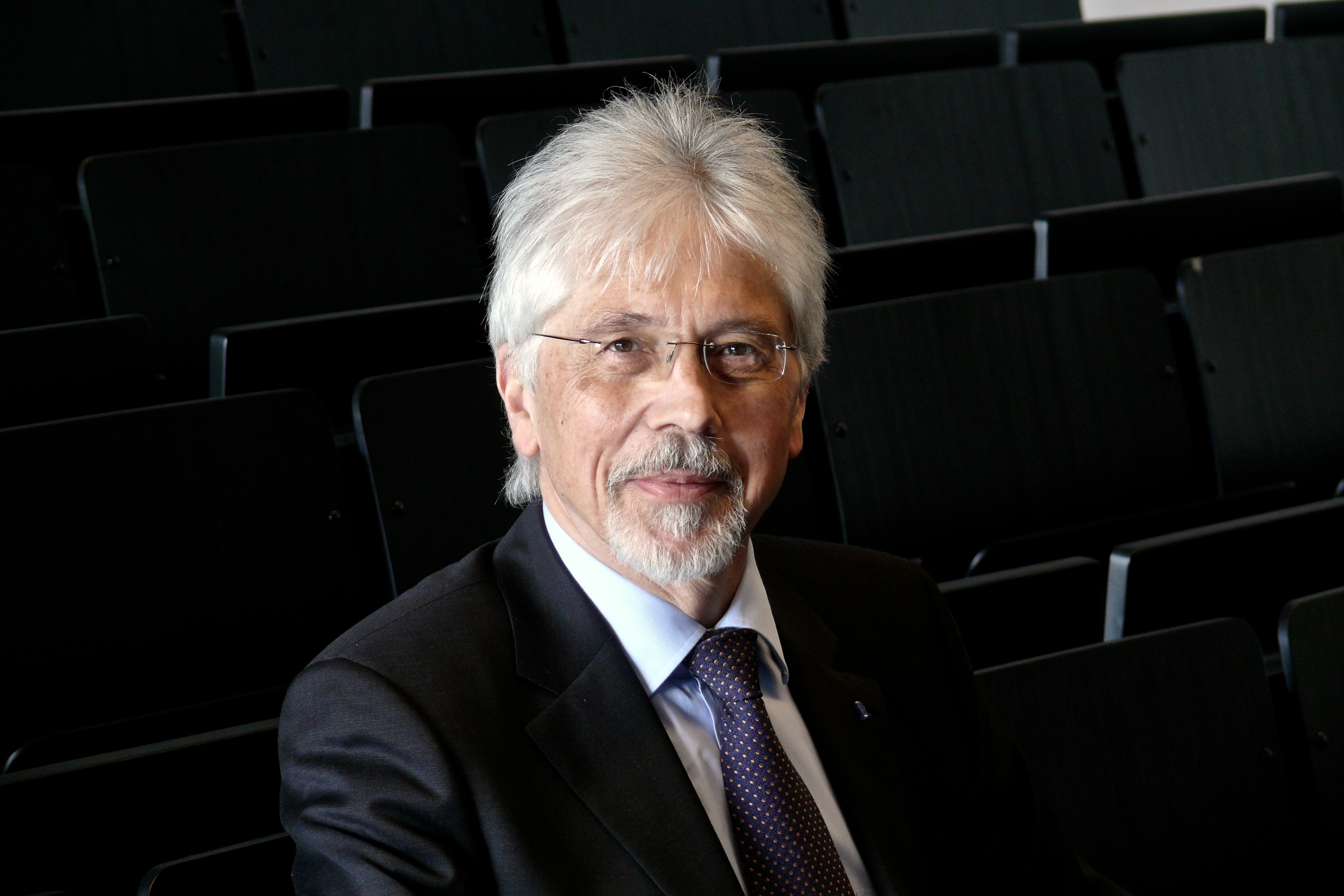
- Born: 13 July 1948 (age 78)
- Education: University of Bonn; LMU Munich
- Scientific career
- Workplaces: Goethe University Frankfurt

Werner Müller-Esterl (born 13 July 1948) is a German biochemist who served as president of the Goethe University Frankfurt from 2009 to 2014.

== Career ==
Born in Bonn, he studied chemistry and medicine at the University of Bonn and LMU Munich. He obtained his medical license in 1979 and his habilitation in clinical biochemistry in 1985. In 1987, he became professor of clinical biochemistry at LMU Munich. In 1989, he became professor of pathobiochemistry at the University of Mainz. In 1999, he became professor of biochemistry at the Goethe University Frankfurt. He was director of the Institute for Biochemistry II and the Gustav Embden Center for Biological Chemistry from 2000. His research focuses on the molecular mechanisms that control the cardiovascular system.

In 2006, he became vice president of the Goethe University Frankfurt, where he was elected president in October 2008.

During Müller-Esterl's presidency, the university faced student protests as part of the 2009 German education strike. In November 2009, students occupied the Casino building on the university's Westend campus. After three days, the university leadership ordered the police eviction of 176 students and staff members and filed criminal complaints against participants. According to a later scholarly analysis, this marked a departure from the university's previous practice of tolerating building occupations on its former Bockenheim campus. The university senate subsequently passed a resolution calling for the unconditional withdrawal of the criminal complaints, which the university presidency did not implement.

He was succeeded by Birgitta Wolff in 2015.[9]
