= York (explorer) =

African-American slave and member of the Lewis and Clark expedition

- York statue at Riverfront Plaza/Belvedere, Louisville, Kentucky
- Born: 1770–1775; Ladysmith, Caroline County, Virginia Colony
- Died: after 1815
- Occupations: Body servant (enslaved), explorer
- Employer: Enslaved by William Clark
- Known for: Participating in the Lewis and Clark Expedition
- Spouse: 1
- Parent(s): Old York, Rose
- Relatives: Juba (brother), Nancy (sister), Scipio (half-brother), Daphney (half-sister)
- Military career
- Branch: United States Army
- Service years: 1803–1806
- Rank: Sergeant (honorary posthumous – Presidential citation)
- Commands: Corps of Discovery

York (1770–1775 – after 1815) was an enslaved man who was the only African-American member of the Lewis and Clark Expedition of 1804–1806. A lifelong slave and personal servant of William Clark, York participated in the entire exploration and made significant contributions to its success. In doing so he became the first African American to cross the continent and to see the Pacific Ocean. He has since become an American icon and several monuments depicting him have been erected in honor of his legacy.

York was born into slavery in the Colony of Virginia, the son of Old York and Rose, both of whom were enslaved by John Clark III, William Clark's father. William inherited York from his father in 1799. He was Clark's "body servant". York was a large man; his weight has been estimated as 200 pounds (91 kg). He was about the same age as Clark, perhaps a few years older or younger, and naturally strong. His skin was dark: he was "black as a bear", said one who knew him, and his hair was short and curly. Like most enslaved persons of the time, York was illiterate, and information about him is scant.

York expected to be given his freedom after the expedition was successfully completed, in view of what he called his "immense services", but Clark refused repeatedly and became angry when York would not go back willingly to his pre-expedition role as Clark's body servant. He also expressed irritation at York's insistence on remaining in Louisville, where his wife and possibly children were. He whipped York.

Documentation concerning York is lacking for the years immediately following the expedition. About 20 years later, Clark told Washington Irving that he had freed York and set him up in business, giving him six horses and a large wagon to start a drayage business moving goods between Nashville and Richmond.

== Early life ==
York was born in Caroline County near Ladysmith, Virginia. His skin was dark-colored. He and several members of his family were enslaved by the Clark family. The will of John Clark III (father of George Rogers and William Clark) states:

I give and bequeath to my son Edmund... three slaves, to wit Peter (Vegas child), and Scipio and Darathy (Rose's children)... I give and bequeath to my son William... one black man named York, also old York and his wife Rose, and their two children, Nancy and Juba; also three old negroes, Tame, Cupid and Harry.

The most plausible family tree based on this description and others is that York was the son of Old York, not by Rose; that Scipio (also spelled Sippo, Seppo, Sep, and Pipo, likely named for the Roman general Scipio Africanus) and Daphny (also spelled Dafney, Daphney, and Daphne) were Rose's children not by Old York; and that Nancy and Juba were Old York and Rose's biological children. This would make Scipio, Daphney, Juba, and Nancy the half-siblings of York.

== On the expedition ==
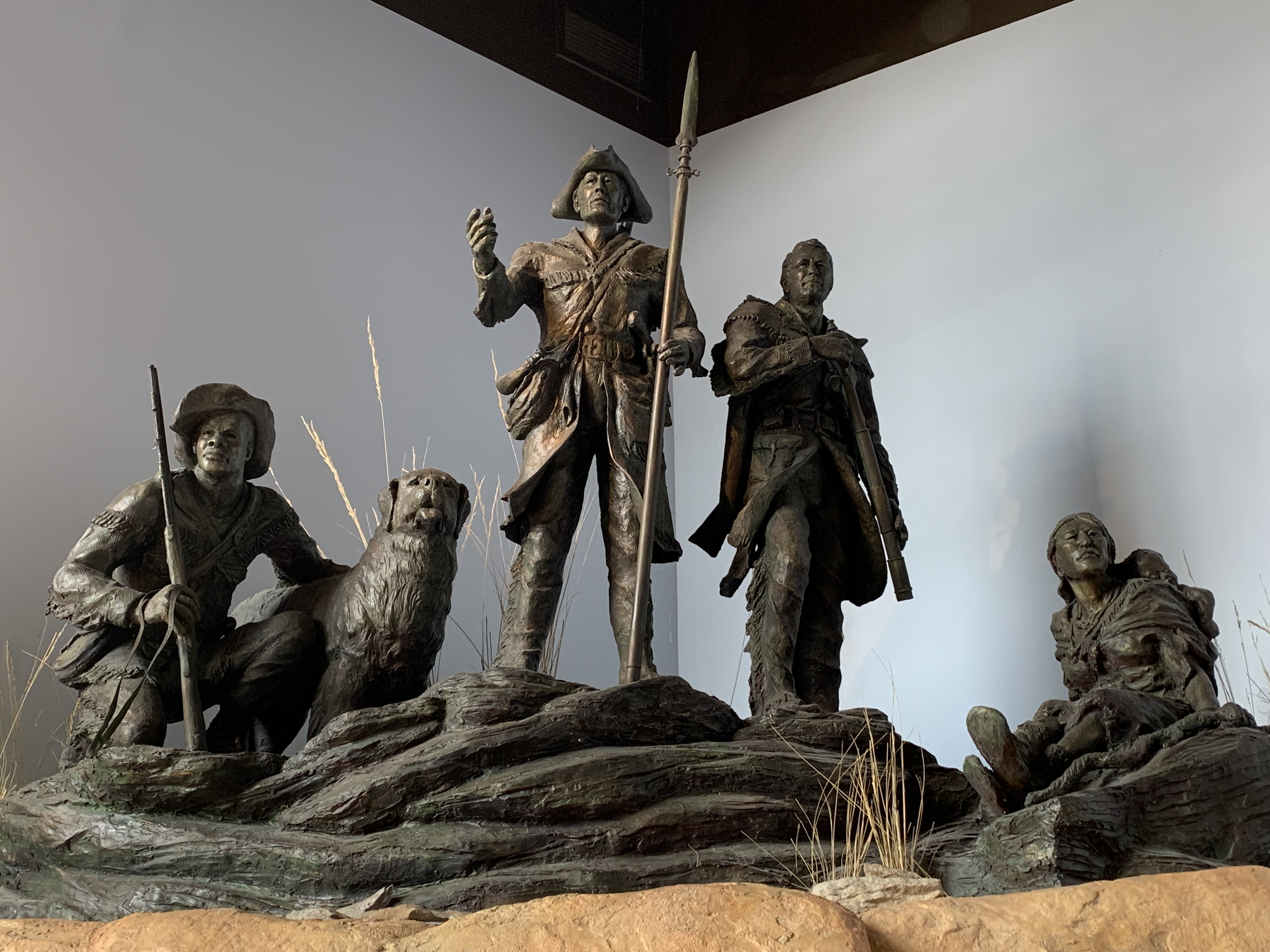
"Explorers at the Portage", by Robert Scriver, in the Lewis and Clark National Historic Trail Interpretative Center, Great Falls, Montana. Left to right: York with a rifle, dog Seaman, Lewis, Clark, Sacagawea and her infant, Jean Baptiste Charbonneau.

York "participated fully in the journey and contributed in significant ways to its success." Surviving records of the well-documented trip do not reveal any overt racial bias against him. For all intents and purposes, York's role in Lewis and Clark's Corps of Discovery was equal to that of the expedition's white men. He could swim, which many of the troupe could not. He was also allowed to use a rifle, something the enslaved were not ordinarily permitted. When a decision had to be made, York's vote counted equally with those of the white men. The expedition apparently maintained none of the usual restrictions on the movement of enslaved people, and while opportunities to escape may have appeared, York remained with the Corps of Discovery.

A modern writer has called York indispensable to the expedition. The journals are peppered with references to York's hunting prowess: he shot buffalo, deer, and geese alike. His use of a rifle is highly unusual and shows the trust expedition members had in him. His skill in hunting with a rifle may have antedated the expedition. He also kept his eye out for new species, for which the expedition was searching. He played a major role in the heavy work of paddling upstream, portaging, and building shelters. He aided in navigating trails and waterways.

=== York and Native Americans ===
York's most spectacular contributions were with the Native American tribes the expedition came into contact with, whose assistance was sometimes very necessary. According to the journals of the expedition members, York's blackness served as a passport with them; they were impressed by such a "strange creature". According to Richard Betts, he was "the main attraction in Lewis and Clark's travelling magic show." York was a sensation.

The following excerpts are from the expedition's official report:

[October 9, 1804] The object which appeared to astonish the Indians most, was captain Clark's servant [slave] York, a remarkable stout strong negro. They had never seen a being of that colour, and therefore flocked round him to examine the extraordinary monster. By way of amusement he told them that he had once been a wild animal, and caught and tamed by his master, and to convince them, showed them feats of strength, which added to his looks made him more terrible than we wished him to be.

[October 10, 1804] ...after this the airgun was exhibited, very much to their astonishment, nor were they less surprised at the colour and manner of York.

[October 12, 1804] These women are handsomer than the Sioux; both of them are however, disposed to be amorous, and our men found no difficulty in procuring companions for the night by means of the interpreters. These interviews were chiefly clandestine, and were of course to be kept a secret from the husband or relations. The point of honour indeed, is completely reversed among the Ricaras; that the wife or the sister should submit to a stranger's embraces without the consent of her husband or brother, is a cause of great disgrace and offence, especially as for many purposes of civility or gratitude the husband and brother will themselves present to a stranger these females, and be gratified by attentions to them. The Sioux had offered us squaws, but while we remained there having declined, they followed us with offers of females for two days. The Ricaras had been equally accommodating; we had equally withstood their temptation; but such was their desire to oblige that two very handsome young squaws were sent on board this evening, and persecuted us with civilities. The black man York participated largely in these favours; for instead of inspiring any prejudice, his colour seemed to procure him additional advantages from the Indians, who desired to preserve among them some memorial of this wonderful stranger. Among other instances of attention, a Ricara invited him into his house and presenting his wife to him, retired to the outside of the door: while there one of York's comrades who was looking for him came to the door, but the gallant husband would permit no interruption before a reasonable time had elapsed. (Numerous other reports confirm that women of these tribes, with their husbands' encouragement, would seek to have sexual intercourse with white men.)

[October 15, 1804] [T]he fair sex received our men with more than hospitality. York was here again an object of astonishment; the children would follow him constantly, and if he chanced to turn towards them, run with great terror.

[October 28, 1804] In the mean while we entertained our visitors by showing them what was new to them in the boat; all which, as well our black servant, they called Great Medicine, the meaning of which we afterwards learnt.

The whole religion of the Mandans consists in the belief of one great spirit presiding over their destinies. This being must be in the nature of a good genius since it is associated with the healing art, and the great spirit is synonymous with great medicine, a name also applied to every thing which they do not comprehend.

[March 9, 1805] In the course of the conversation, the chief observed that some foolish young men of his nation had told him there was a person among us who was quite black, and he wished to know if it could be true. We assured him that it was true, and sent for York: the Borgne [Indian chief] was very much surprised at his appearance, examined him closely, and spit on his finger and rubbed the skin in order to wash off the paint; nor was it until the negro uncovered his head, and showed his short hair, that the Borgne could be persuaded that he was not a painted white man.

[August 17, 1805] They had indeed abundant sources of suspiscion in all they saw: the appearance of the men, their arms, their clothing, the canoes, the strange looks of the negro, and the sagacity of our dog, all in turn shared their admiration.

York is not mentioned by name, but at their 1805–06 winter camp on the Columbia River, Indians brought their women to market "for a fishinghook or a string of beads", resulting in cases of "venereal disease".

The memory of York persisted in Indian oral tradition until the 20th century.

=== Arriving at the Pacific and voting ===
On November 18, 1805, York accompanied Clark to a tree at what is now Cape Disappointment State Park in the U.S. state of Washington, where Clark added his name to Lewis's and carved in the tree "By Land from the U. States in 1804 & 1805". York became the first African-American man to reach the Pacific Ocean when he walked nineteen miles (31 km) from camp with Clark. In late November, all the members of the party, including York and Sacagawea, were consulted by the leaders as to where to camp for the winter. According to Martin Plamondon II, to call this a vote, as it is often called, is to create a myth; there is no implication that the vote of the majority was followed. He calls it "polling" rather than voting. In a reply, Dayton Duncan notes that Clark wrote down the views on the question of every member of the expedition, including York and Sacagawea. This was itself very unusual. The men believed that they, not the leaders, had made the decision. According to Duncan, it was a vote. Glen Kirkpatrick disagrees.

=== Mentions in Clark's journal ===
The name York is mentioned in the Lewis and Clark journals 135 times.

- York is first mentioned in Clark's journal on December 26, 1803, when Clark writes that York and Corporal Whitehouse had been working with the whipsaws, indicating that he was already working with the other men on the expedition.
- Clark mentions York again in his journal on June 5, 1804, noting that York had swum to a sand bar from the keelboat in order to collect some greens for dinner. The majority of the men on the expedition could not swim.
- Clark and another man said that, on June 20, 1804, York almost lost his eye during an assault/altercation when he had sand thrown at him.
- York was mentioned again in Clark's journal after a small party including York descended the Spirit Mound Historic Prairie. Clark said that "York was nearly exhausted by the heat, thirst and fatigue". Clark said this was because York was too fat and unaccustomed to walking quickly.
- In September 1804 it was noted that while on a hunting party York had killed an elk. There is no record of York having trained to use a firearm, which was not generally allowed for slaves.

== After the expedition ==
All the men of the expedition except York received double pay according to rank, $5 to $30 per month, and each enlisted man was granted 320 acres (130 ha) of land. York, as a slave, received nothing.

Contrary to the general belief that Clark freed York immediately after their return, York remained enslaved and the property of Clark for at least five more years. He accompanied Clark on the latter's celebratory visit to Washington, D.C., in 1807, and when Clark moved his family to St. Louis to take up his new position as brigadier general of the militia and Superintendent of Indian Affairs in the new territory.

Historian Robert Betts said the freedom York had during the Lewis and Clark expedition made resuming enslavement unbearable. York asked Clark for his freedom based upon his good services during the expedition.

=== William Clark's letters to his brother ===
In 1988, 47 letters written by Clark to his brother Jonathan were discovered; written between 1792 and 1811, they were published as a volume in 2002. Information concerning York was one of the main surprises in the letters, according to their editor James J. Holmberg. From them it was discovered that York had a wife, and that his marriage antedated the expedition, which was deliberately made up primarily of unmarried men, like Lewis and Clark themselves. All that is known of his wife is that she was from the Louisville area, where Clark and York lived before the expedition, and that she was enslaved by someone other than Clark. York's attempts to persuade Clark to let him return to the Louisville area led to a serious falling-out between them in 1808.

That year Clark moved to St. Louis, to take up his new duties as US agent for Indian affairs. York and other household members moved with him. By November 1808, Clark was angered by York's refusal to accept the move to St. Louis and repeated requests that he be hired out in Louisville or sold to someone there. As Clark wrote his brother when finally giving in, he decided to:

send York...and promit him to Stay a few weeks with his wife. he wishes to Stay there altogether and hire himself which I have refused. he prefers being Sold to return[ing] here, he is Serviceable to me at this place, and I am determined not to Sell him to gratify him, and have derected him to return.

York was sent to work for a strict Louisville nephew, John H. Clark. A few weeks later, Clark mentions York again to his brother:

I did wish to do well by him, but as he has got Such a notion about freedom and his emence [immense] Services, that I do not expect he will be of much Service to me again; I do not think with him, that his Services has [sic] been so great/or my Situation would promit me to liberate him.

Clark believed that York would not provide "service" in St. Louis, and this angered him. He wrote his brother again that he would have punished York, and that if he is hired out in Kentucky, it should be with a "Severe Master" so that after "a while he may do Some Service, I do not wish him again in this Country until he applies himself to Come and give over that wife of his—I wished him to Stay with his family four or five weeks only, and not 4 or 5 months."

York was forced to return to St. Louis, where Clark found him "insolent and sulky". To "mend" this, Clark whipped York ("gave him a Severe trouncing"). He put him in jail ("Caleboos", slang Spanish calabozo) in July 1809. By August Clark had decided "to hire or Sell him". This is the last mention of York in the letters written by William Clark. An 1811 letter from a Louisville relative reported that "I don't like him nor does any other person in this country", and also that the owner of York's wife was going to move to Natchez, Mississippi. York was hired out as a wagoner, making deliveries in Louisville; the last reference to him is from 1815. Another report has him transporting goods between Nashville and Richmond.

=== Washington Irving's report ===
None of the information in Clark's letters was known to the general public in the 19th and 20th centuries. During that long period, a report by Washington Irving provided the only account of York's later life. By then a successful writer, Irving visited Clark at his home near St. Louis in 1832. Irving may have been the one to ask about York, as his account labels York "the hero of the expedition", which Clark is unlikely to have stated:

His slaves—set them free—one he placed at a ferry—another on a farm, giving him land, horses, &c.—a third he gave a large wagon & team of 6 horses to ply between Nashville and Richmond. They all repented & wanted to come back.

The wagoner was York, the hero of the Missouri expedition & adviser of the Indians. He could not get up early enough in the morning—his horses were ill kept—two died—the others grew poor. He sold them, was cheated—entered into service—fared ill. Damn this freedom, said York. I have never had a happy day since I got it. He determined to go back to his old master—set off for S^{t} Louis, but was taken with the cholera in Tennessee & died. Some of the traders think they have met traces of York's crowd, on the Missouri.

Historians have been unable to verify these claims. Manumission of a slave was a formal process that required documentation. No known documents exist confirming that Clark ever freed York. According to Darrell Millner, there is nothing to corroborate any of these claims, and York's alleged desire to return to slavery "lacks historical foundation". Clark's story is self-serving and reflects pro-slavery arguments that Africans were happy to be slaves and could not lead successful lives as free people. Millner further states that it is "much more likely" that York was never freed.

=== Zenas Leonard's report ===
Zenas Leonard was a fur trader who in 1839 published a memoir of his travels in 1832 - 1834 with the Joseph Walker expedition throughout the upper West and into California. Leonard reported seeing "a negro man" living well among the Crows of what is today north-central Wyoming, who purportedly said he had returned from St. Louis after first visiting the area with Lewis and Clark. The identity of this Black man has been subject to much speculation. Modern scholars suggest it may have been York.

== Legacy ==
There is no doubt from the journals written during the expedition that York played a vital role in its success. Not only did he fulfill his duties as a laborer through the course of the expedition, the journals also suggest that the color of York's skin intrigued the Native tribes so much they seemingly gave the expedition a pass through the land as well as became willing to trade. The journals also suggest that York had gained the respect of many of the men who were part of the expedition as well.

=== The Sambo and the superhero ===
Darrell Millner has studied how York's image has been shaped and presented over 200 years. He classifies scholarly treatment of York into what he calls two broad categories: the Sambo school, which has been the main trend until very recently, and the superhero school.

The Sambo version of York presents him as a happy slave, but, like all slaves, much in need of a white owner to run his life better than he could himself. In the Sambo tradition, York is neither manly nor heroic, qualities only whites can have. His role and contributions are systematically reduced to behavior that was considered fitting and appropriate for a negro, ignoring the positive aspects of York's character and contributions, distorting some incidents to cast them in the most unfavorable light possible, and projecting onto York unsubstantiated qualities, such as a thick "Negro" dialect and an insatiable sexual appetite.

In contrast, the superhero presentation of York has elevated him "to near superhuman status and his contributions to the expedition were unsurpassed by others in the Corps of Discovery. The superhero York is the quintessential role model, a courageous, ingenious, brave, and self-sacrificing black hero who has overcome all of the obstacles that slavery and a hostile frontier threw at him. This York ultimately prevails; he is a figure not only for blacks to admire but also for them to emulate."

=== Creative works based on York ===
- In 1972, one of the six sections of Peter Michaelson's poem/essay "Bestride the Mighty and Heretofore Deemed Endless Missouri: An Essay on the Corps of Discovery", deals with York.
- As part of the Lewis and Clark bicentennial celebrations of 2003, an opera titled York, composed by Bruce Trinkley with the libretto by Jason Charnesky, was presented at the Penn State Opera Theater.
- A one-man play, York, created by playwright Bryan Harnetiaux in collaboration with actor and African drummer David Casteal, directed by Susan Hardie, and performed by Casteal, premiered at the Spokane Civic Theatre in Spokane, Washington, on April 29, 2005. According to Harnetiaux, "One element you see is the affinity between York's African drumming experience and the Native American drumming". There were off-Broadway performances in New York City in July 2006, and a short production run in 2008. In commemoration of Black History Month, the play was again presented in Spokane on February 27–28, 2016, again with David Casteal starring. It was revived again on February 2, 2018.
- Kentucky poet Frank X Walker has written two books of poetry about York: Buffalo Dance: The Journey of York (2004) and When Winter Come: The Ascension of York (2008). According to the publisher, the University of Kentucky Press, "This collection of persona poems tells the story of the infamous Lewis & Clark expedition from the point of view of Clark's personal slave, York. The poems form a narrative of York's inner and outer journey, before, during and after the expedition—a journey from slavery to freedom, from the plantation to the great northwest, from servant to soul yearning to be free." The books were very well received: "Singly and together, these books are a great success: they portray the complex character of York, [and] they enrich our understanding of an important chapter in American history", wrote William Joliff in a review article.

In his 1964 Western novel Little Big Man, Thomas Berger mentions York as having possibly been the father of some dark-skinned Indians.

=== Honors (in chronological order) ===
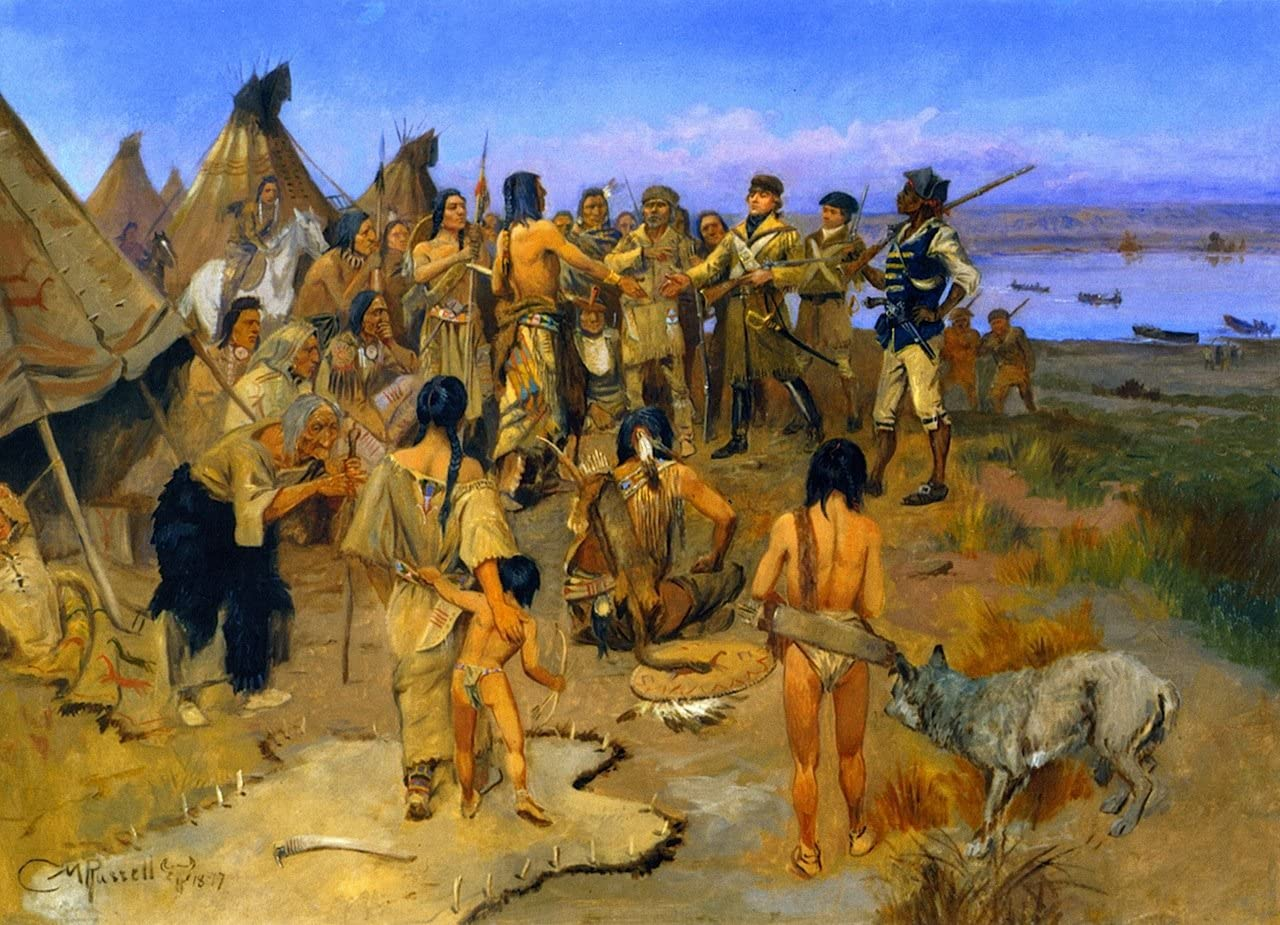
Lewis and Clark meeting the Mandan Indians, by Charles Marion Russell, 1897. Left to right, Lewis, Clark, and York. Sacajawea and her child are seen from the back, in the foreground.

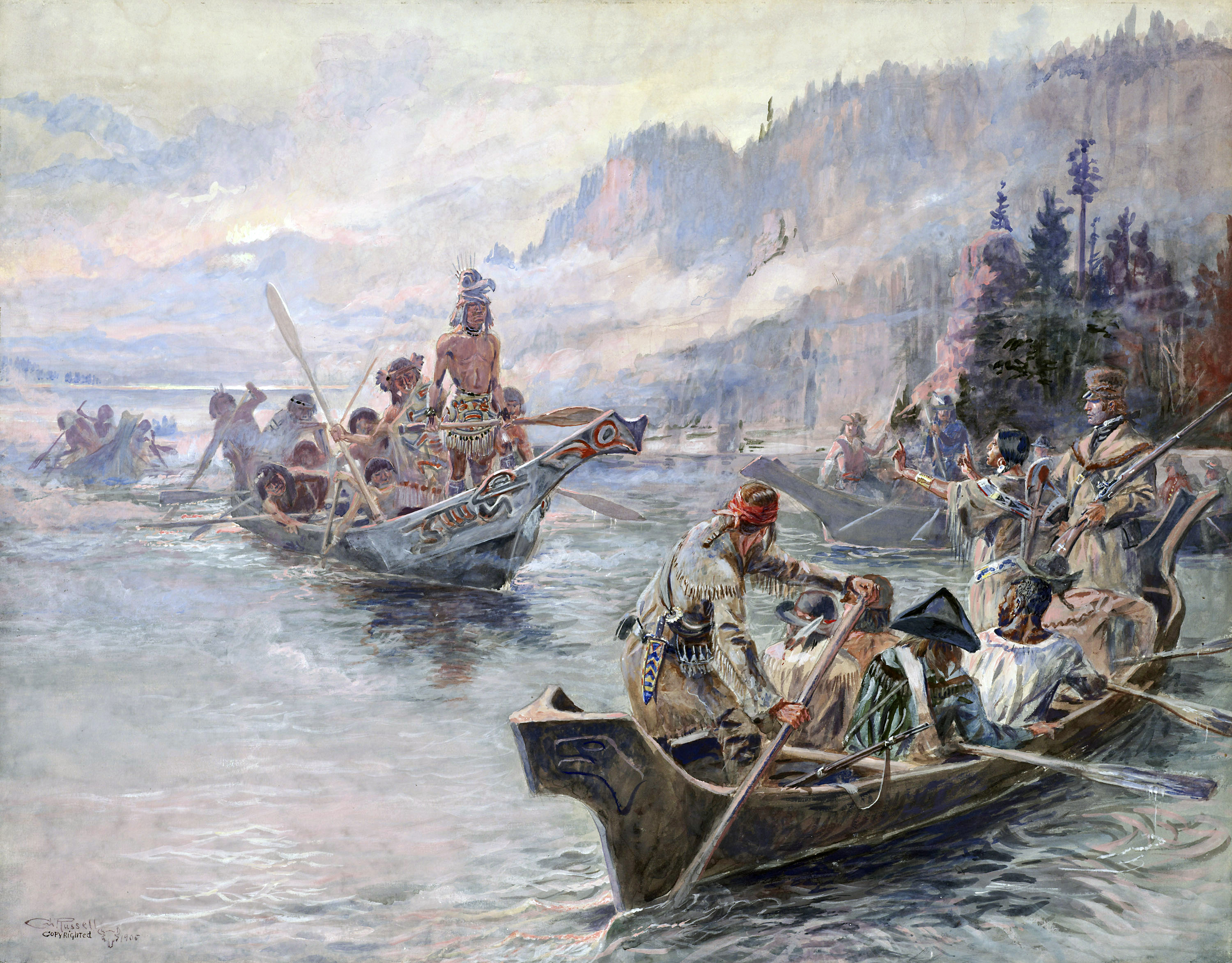
York is in the canoe on the right, which is quite different from the Indian canoe on the left. Louis and Clark on the Lower Columbia, by Charles Marion Russell, 1905.

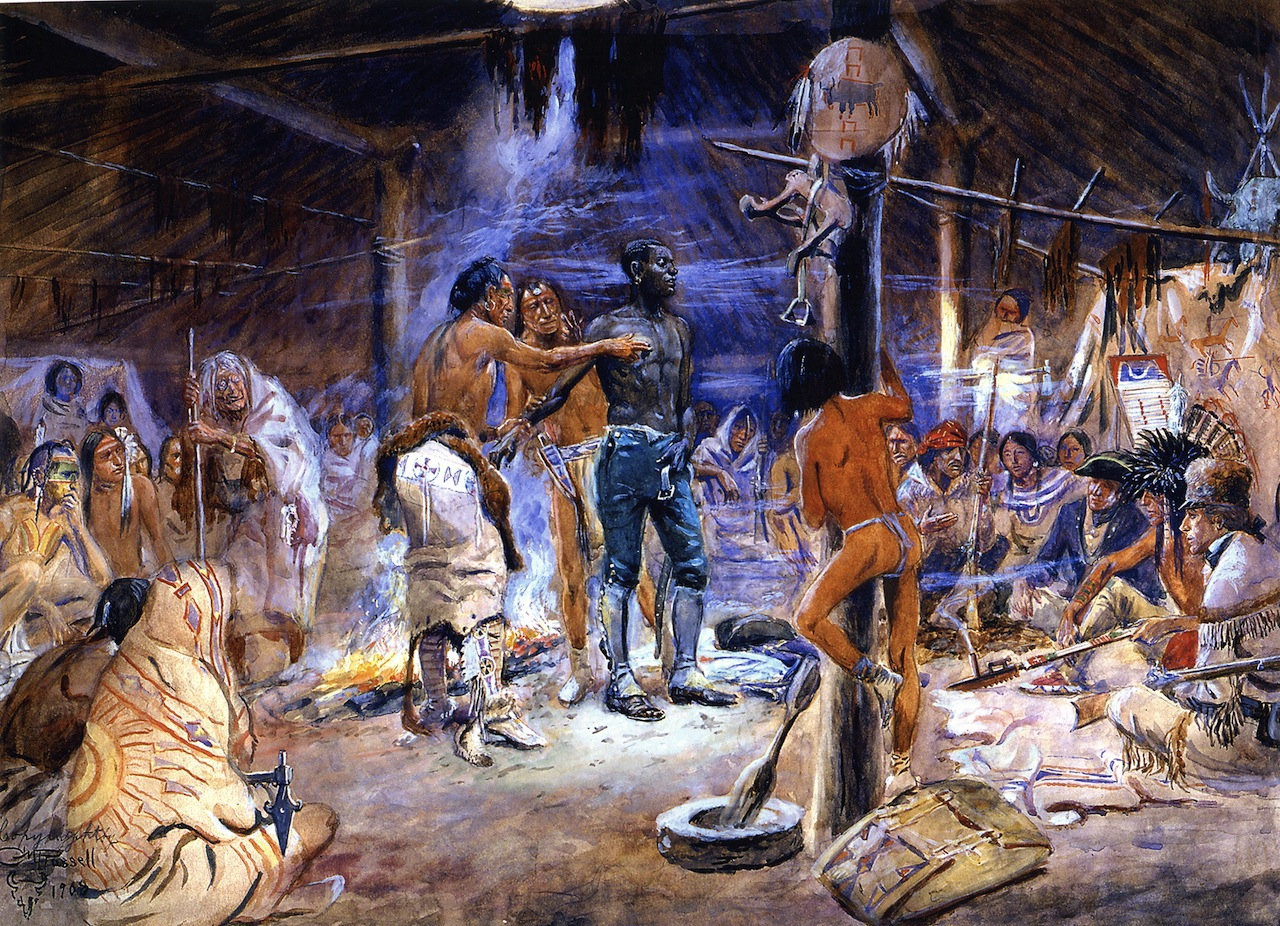
York, by Charles Marion Russell, 1908

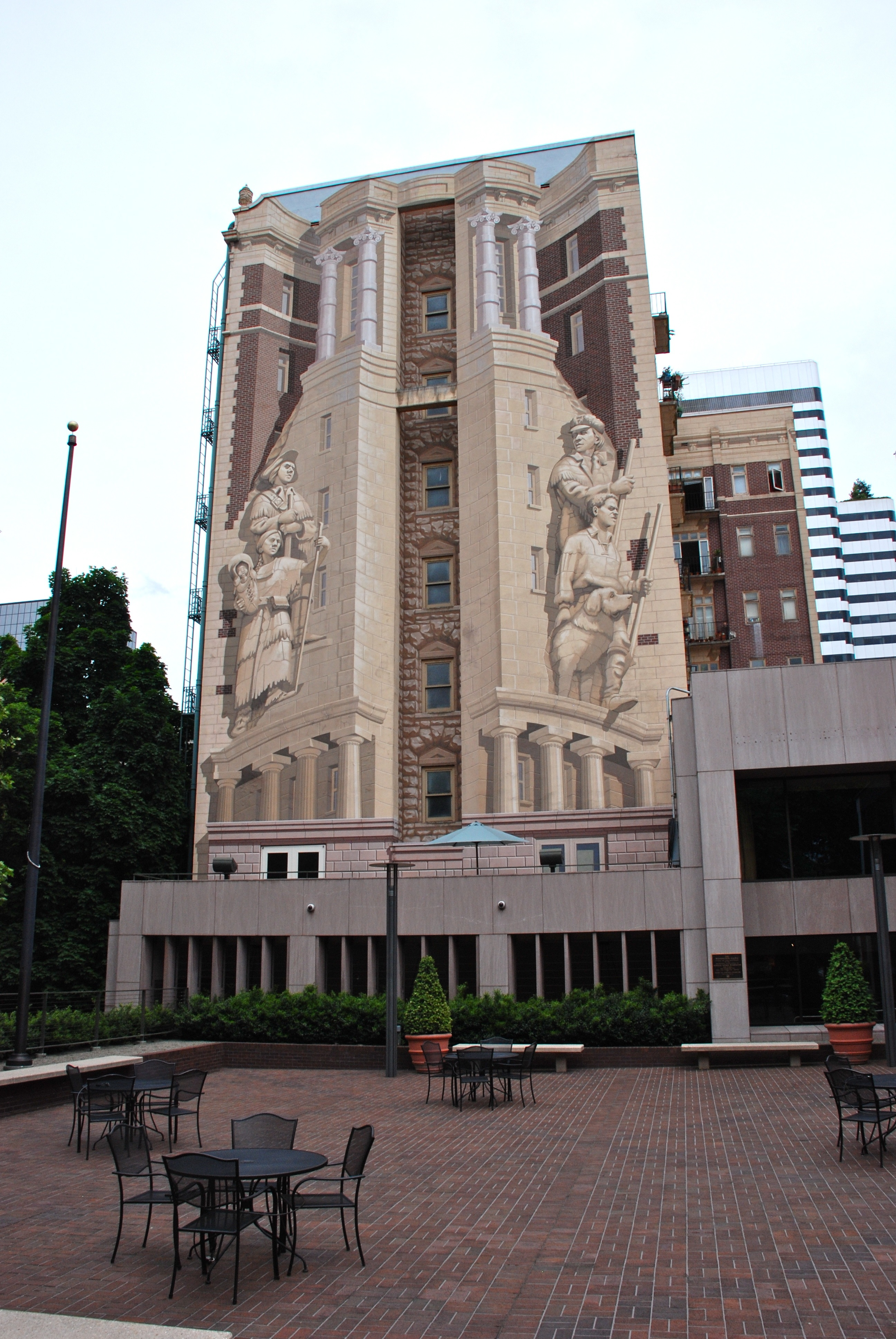
Mural by Richard Haas, west face of the former Sovereign Hotel (Portland, Oregon). York is at bottom right.

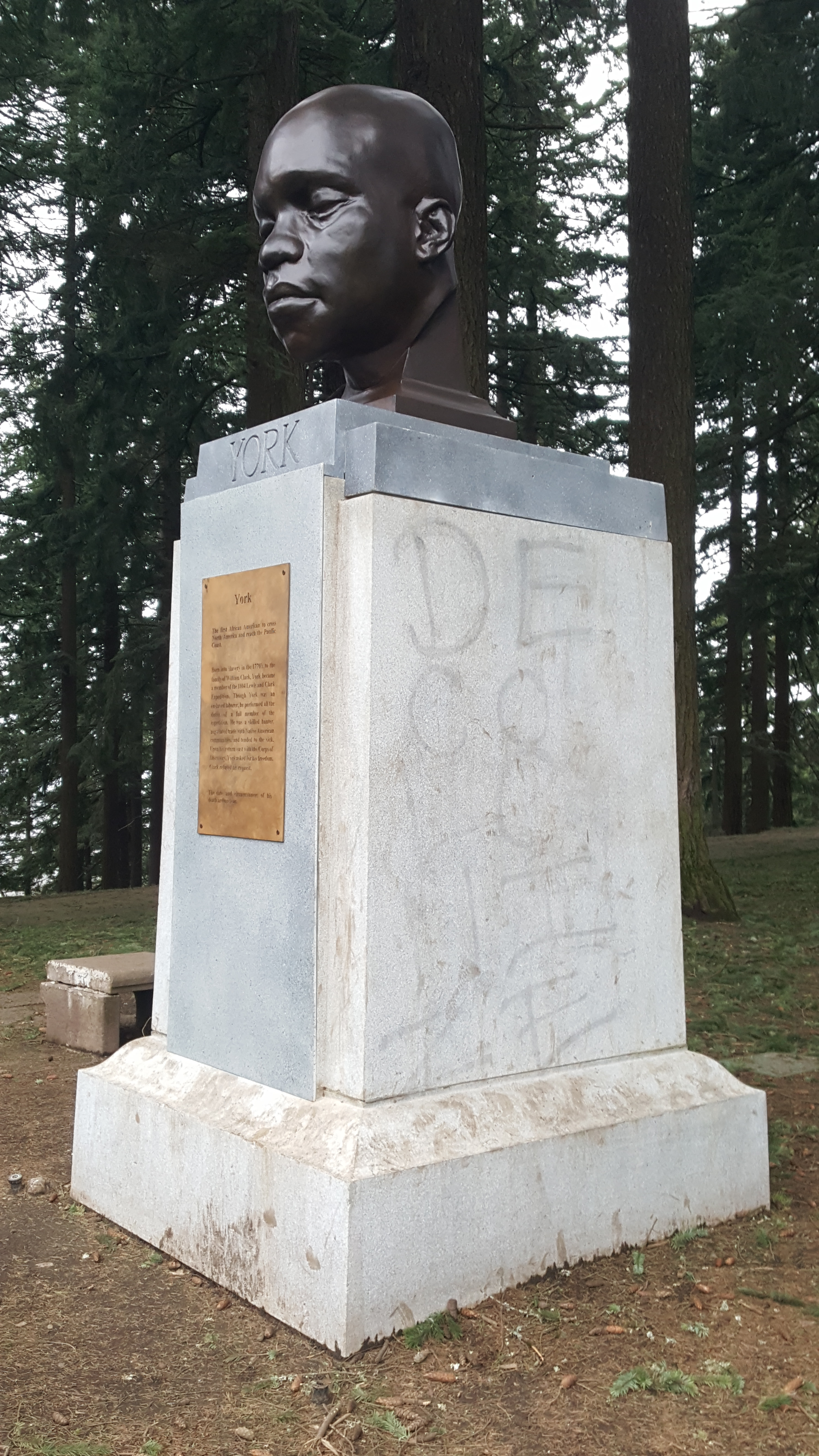
Bust of York, placed on the base of the toppled statue of Harvey W. Scott, in Portland, Oregon

- York appears in several paintings by Western artist Charles Marion Russell. In the painting commonly known as Lewis and Clark meeting the Mandan Indians (1897), York is well and distinctively dressed. In the painting Louis and Clark on the Lower Columbia (1905), he is seen from the back, working, and in plain slave clothing. In York (1908), no European Americans are present. York meets with Native Americans, who are curious about him, examining his dark skin.
- "Bilalian Odyssey" by Isaka Shamsud-din (1983) "transfers York from the periphery to the center of the dramatic story of which he is a part."
- In 1988, the sculpture The Naming of Mt. Jefferson by Michael Florin Dente was erected on the campus of the University of Portland. It portrays William Clark, York, and an unnamed Native American. According to the artist, the work stands as "a visual reminder that three races contributed to the success of the Lewis and Clark Expedition—symbolic of the first integrated society in the Oregon country." In 2020, the statue of York was removed from the sculpture.
- In July 1989, a group of statues by sculptor Bob Scriver, "Explorers at the Portage", was erected in Overlook Park in Great Falls, Montana. It depicts Meriwether Lewis, William Clark, York, and the expedition's dog, Seaman, surveying the junction of the Missouri and Sun rivers. Scriver donated a copy of the work, now with Sacagawea added (photo above), to the Lewis and Clark National Historic Trail Interpretive Center, located near the city on the Crooked Falls of the Great Falls of the Missouri River.
- In 1989, the Oregon Historical Society commissioned Richard Haas to create eight-story-high murals for the former Sovereign Hotel, which at the time it owned. One mural depicts the people of the Lewis & Clark Expedition, including York and Sacagawea.
- York's Stripes, by Porter Williams, 1998, shows the stripes of York's whipping on his back. link
- In 2000, Yorks Islands was accepted by the U.S. Board of Geographic Names as designation for an archipelago of islands in the Missouri River in Broadwater County, Montana, which were named for York by the Lewis and Clark Expedition. The privately owned islands were called by Clark "York's 8 Islands", but have since become known as "York's Islands" or simply "Yorks Islands". A small tributary of the Yellowstone River was also named for York.
- Western artist Michael Haynes in 2000 produced "Proud Hunter", an illustration of York alone, carrying a small deer. link
- In 2000, a statue by Eugene Daub was erected at Clark's Point in Case Park in Kansas City, Missouri, depicting Lewis, Clark, York, Sacagawea, and Seaman. link
- In 2000, York was mentioned on a historical marker at the former location of Mulberry Hill, Clark's family home in Louisville. link
- In 2001, President Bill Clinton posthumously granted York the rank of honorary sergeant in the United States Army.
- In 2001, York was inducted into the Hall of Great Westerners at the National Cowboy and Western Heritage Museum, Oklahoma City, Oklahoma.
- In 2002, the City Council of Portland voted to affirm that "York Street", the origins of which name were hitherto unknown, is to be understood as referring to this York.
- In 2003, a statue of York by sculptor Ed Hamilton, with plaques commemorating the Lewis and Clark Expedition and his participation in it, was placed on Louisville's Riverfront Plaza/Belvedere, next to the wharf on the Ohio River.
- Also in Louisville in 2003, the Kentucky Historical Society and the Kentucky Department of Highways erected a historical marker along the Ohio River. link
- York has a prominent place in a 2005 mural of the expedition by David McClain in Liberty, Missouri. link
- 2008: Lewis and Clark Trailhead Monument by Sabra Tull Meyer, in Jefferson City, Missouri. Group depicts, left to right, York, Lewis, Seaman, Clark, and interpreter George Drouillard. Funding problems had delayed it since 2002. link
- 2010: York: Terra Incognita, a 6-foot (1.8 m) bronze statue by Alison Saar, was installed on the campus of Lewis and Clark College in Portland, Oregon. Since we do not know what York looked like, the artist focused instead on the statue's back, making it a focal point. The back is "scarred" with sections of William Clark's maps. The project was begun by four law students.
- In 2021, a 4-foot (1.2 m) bust of York was secretly installed atop a pedestal which formerly contained a statue of anti-Native American pioneer Harvey W. Scott, in Portland, Oregon's Mount Tabor Park. Attached to the pedestal was a paper plaque describing York's role in the Lewis and Clark expedition. The artist at first was unknown, but subsequently revealed that he was Todd McGrain. The bust was toppled and seriously damaged in July 2021. A white supremacist group, Patriot Front, is suspected.

== Writings about York ==
There are no writings by York himself, as he was illiterate. The bitterness between him and Clark prevented him from telling his story for publication as a slave narrative.

- General
  - Betts, Robert (2000) [1985]. In Search of York: The Slave Who Went to the Pacific with Lewis and Clark. Includes an "Afterwards" by James J. Holberg (Revised ed.). Denver: Colorado Associated University Press. ISBN 0-87081-714-0.
  - Millner, Darrell M. (Fall 2003). "York of the Corps of Discovery: Interpretations of York's Character and His Role in the Lewis and Clark Expedition". Oregon Historical Quarterly. 104 (3): 302–333. doi:10.1353/ohq.2003.0005. JSTOR 20615343. S2CID 165692798.
  - Parks, Shoshi (March 8, 2018). "York Explored the West With Lewis and Clark, But His Freedom Wouldn't Come Until Decades Later". Smithsonian Magazine. Archived from the original on 2020-05-20.
- Screenplay
  - Ferraro & Stewart, Thomas E. & Jon (2019). York. Chicago, IL: Red Dock, Inc.
- Children's books
  - Steenwyk, Elizabeth (2000). My Name is York. Northland Publishing. ISBN 978-0-87358-758-7.
  - Gustafson, R. W. (2000). York : the slave who helped explore America. Conrad, Montana: The author. ISBN 1-84197-076-X.
  - Blumberg, Rhoda (2004). York's adventures with Lewis and Clark : an African-American's part in the great expedition. New York: Collins. ISBN 0-06-009113-4.
  - Murphy, Claire Rudolf (2005). I Am Sacajawea, I Am York : Our Journey West with Lewis and Clark. Walker & Company. ISBN 978-0-8027-8919-8.
  - Pringle, Laurence (2006). American slave, American hero : York of the Lewis and Clark Expedition. Honesdale, Pennsylvania: Calkins Creek Books. ISBN 1-59078-282-8.
  - Phillips, Brad (2006). York: A Slave's Journey With Lewis and Clark. Nephi, Utah: Apricot Press. ISBN 978-1-885027-36-8.
  - Jaime, Catherine McGrew (2011). York proceeded on : the Lewis & Clark Expedition through the eyes of their forgotten member. Madison, Alabama: Creative Learning Connection. ISBN 978-1-4565-8936-3.
  - Davis, Hasan (2019). The Journey of York: Unsung Hero of the Lewis and Clark Expedition. North Mankato, Minnesota: Capstone Publishing. ISBN 978-1-5435-1290-8.

== Film ==
- 2005: York, the slave of William Clark. 16:34. Produced for the Lewis and Clark Bicentennial by Executive Productions, Seattle.
- 2009: Searching for York. 29:01. Oregon Public Broadcasting.
- 2017: York: One Man's Story. 6:56. Lewis and Clark National Historical Park.
- 2018: York: American's Forgotten Explorer. 18:48. Stefan Milo.
- 2020: A Conversation with Hasan Davis: York, Equity, Race and the Lewis and Clark Story. 58:28. Lewis and Clark National Historic Trail, National Park Service.
- 2020: York: The African American Man Traveling with the Lewis & Clark Expedition. 8:16. BrightRoad2Success.
- 2021: Lewis & Clark State Historic Site, Illinois Department of Natural Resources.
  - York Before the Expedition. 9:16.
  - Building the Team VII: York On the Expedition. 8:30.
  - York After the Expedition 10:40.

== See also ==
- Estevanico
- List of people from the Louisville metropolitan area
- List of enslaved people
- Shields Green
- Stephen Bishop (cave explorer), another accomplished African-American slave from Kentucky, renowned as an explorer
- Timeline of the Lewis and Clark Expedition
