= Harriet Tubman Memorial (New York City) =

Sculpture in Manhattan, New York, U.S.

- Artist: Alison Saar
- Year: 2008
- Type: bronze and Chinese granite
- Location: Manhattan, New York City; 40°48′29″N 73°57′10″W

The Harriet Tubman Memorial, also known as Swing Low, located in Manhattan in New York City, honors the life of abolitionist Harriet Tubman. The intersection at which it stands—122nd Street, Frederick Douglass Boulevard, and St. Nicholas Avenue—was previously a barren traffic island, and is now known as "Harriet Tubman Triangle". As part of its redevelopment, the traffic island was landscaped with plants native to New York and to Tubman's home state of Maryland, representing the land which she and her Underground Railroad passengers travelled across.

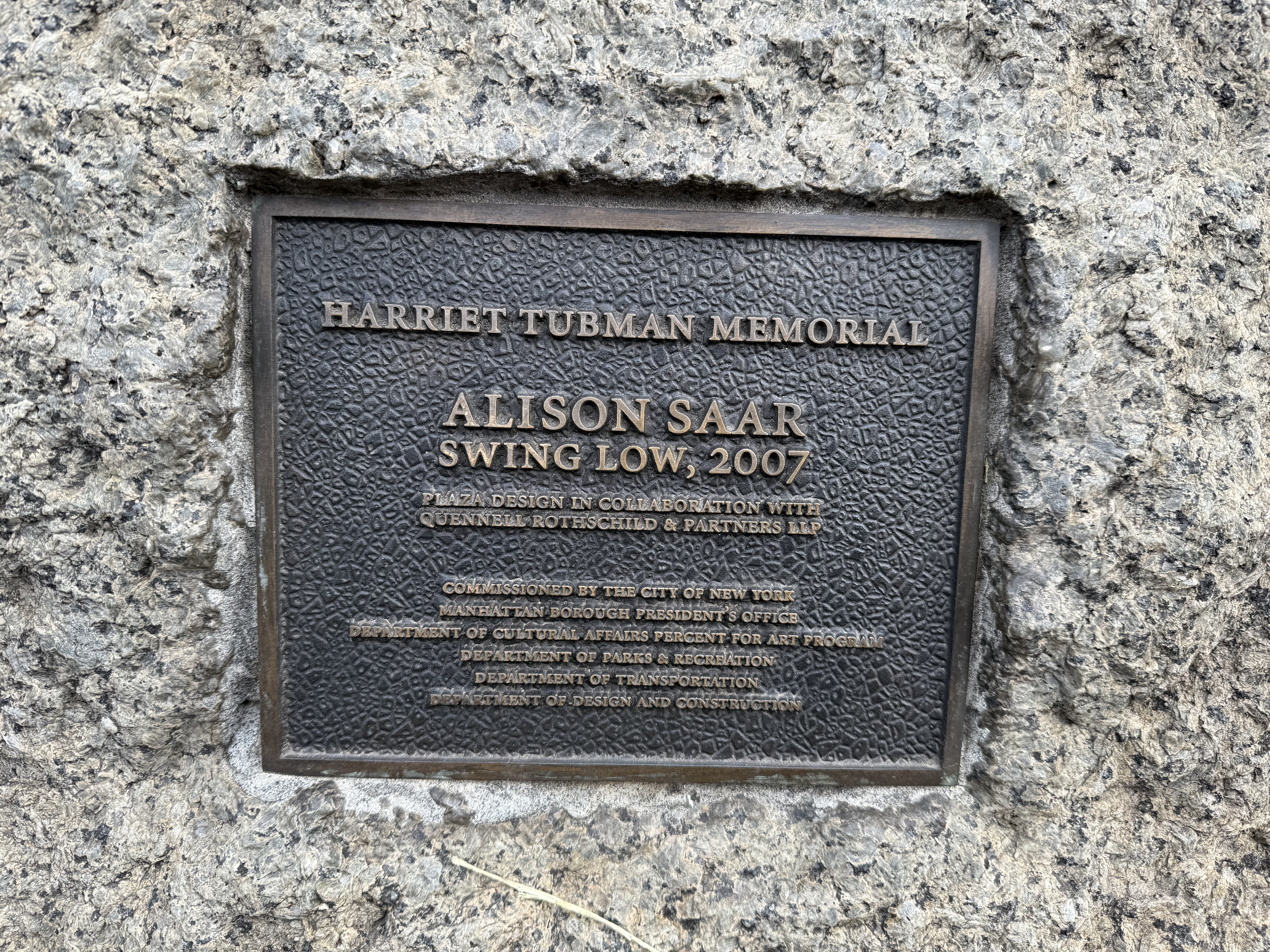
Plaque at the Harriet Tubman Memorial, December 2025

The memorial was commissioned through the Department of Cultural Affairs Percent for Art program, and the development was managed by a multi-agency group consisting of representatives of the Parks and Recreation Commission, Department of Cultural Affairs, Department of Design and Construction and Department of Transportation.

The memorial is a 13-foot (4.0 m) bronze and Chinese granite portrait sculpture, and was created by sculptor Alison Saar. It was dedicated on November 13, 2008. Among those present at the dedication ceremony were Parks and Recreation Commissioner Adrian Benepe, former Manhattan Borough President C. Virginia Fields, Schomburg Center for Research in Black Culture curator Christopher Moore, and Congressman Charles Rangel.

The name "Swing Low" refers to Swing Low, Sweet Chariot, an African-American spiritual song. According to Saar, the song was thought to be one of Tubman's favorite songs, and also one of the songs used to convey coded information to escaping slaves as they moved north.

The statue depicts Tubman striding forward despite roots pulling on the back of her skirt; these represent the roots of slavery. Her skirt is decorated with images representing the former slaves who Tubman assisted to escape. The base of the statue features illustrations representing moments from Tubman's life, alternated with traditional quilting symbols.

In 2005, the traffic island and the statue received a New York City Public Design Commission Award for Excellence in Design.
