= Silos =

Silos is the plural of silo, a farm structure in which fodder or forage is kept.

Silos may also refer to:

- Santo Domingo de Silos, Spain
- Silos, Norte de Santander, Colombia
- Los Silos, a municipality and town on the island Tenerife, Canary Islands, Spain
- The Silos, Montana, a census-designated place in the United States
- The Silos, an American band
- Silos (Sara Storer album), 2016
- Silos (Starset album), 2025, and the title track
- Jair Amador Silos (born 1989), Portuguese footballer
- Manuel Silos (1906–1988), Filipino filmmaker
