= Zenas Leonard =

American explorer and trader (1809–1857)

- Born: March 19, 1809; Clearfield County, Pennsylvania, US
- Died: July 14, 1857 (aged 48); Sibley, Jackson County, Missouri, US
- Occupation: Mountain Man
- Spouse: Isabel B. Harrelson

Zenas Leonard (March 19, 1809 – July 14, 1857) was an American mountain man, explorer and trader, known for his journal Narrative of the Adventures of Zenas Leonard. Leonard was born in Clearfield County, Pennsylvania. As a young adult, he worked for his uncle in Pittsburgh before moving to St. Louis and working as a clerk for the fur company, Gannt and Blackwell.

In 1831 he went with Gannt and Blackwell's company of about 70 men on a trapping and trading expedition. Living off the land (Leonard reported that "The flesh of the Buffaloe is the wholesomest and most palatable of meat kind"), Leonard and his associates endured great privation while amassing a fortune in furs; the horses died in the harsh winter and the party was at times near starvation. They survived, in part, by trading with Native Americans. Among the more helpful tribal members he reported encountering was a negro who claimed to have been on Lewis & Clark's expedition, and who may have been the explorer-slave York.

In 1833 Leonard joined the trapping and exploring expedition led by Benjamin Bonneville. At the Great Salt Lake a group led by Joseph R. Walker, including Leonard, split off from Bonneville and followed the Humboldt River, then crossed the Sierra Nevada mountains into California. Leonard’s journal provides detailed descriptions of life in California in the Mexican period.

In 1835 Leonard returned to Independence, Missouri, with enough wealth in furs to establish a store and trading post at Fort Osage. He continued to trade along the river for the rest of his life.

Leonard's journal was published in book form by D.W. Moore of Clearfield, Pennsylvania, in 1839, after being serialized in the Clearfield Republican. It includes many details of the different tribes with which his parties interacted. As it is in the public domain, there are numerous reprints.

== See also ==
- Wildcat Bill
