= Yorks Islands =

Group of islands in the state of Montana, USA

- Location within Montana

Geography
- Location: Missouri River, Broadwater County, Montana
- Coordinates: 46°15′45″N 111°29′28″W
- Highest elevation: 3,855 ft (1175 m)

Yorks Islands, also known as "Yorks 8 Islands" or "York's Islands" or simply "York Island(s)" are a group of several islands in the flood plain of the Missouri River, in Broadwater County, Montana, about 4 miles south (up-river) from Townsend, Montana, along U.S. Highway 287. The islands were named by the Lewis and Clark Expedition (1803–1806) for Clark's slave York, when the expedition passed this way in 1805 on their historic journey of exploration to the Pacific Ocean. The islands may be accessed from U.S.287, as a Montana Fishing Access site.

== Naming Yorks Islands ==
The islands were named for York (ca. 1770–1831), Captain William Clark's lifelong slave companion, and "body servant" who accompanied Clark on the expedition to the Pacific and back.

The expedition passed this point on July 24, 1805. The name "Yorks 8 Islands" is not found in the narrative journals of Lewis and Clark for that day; it is, however, found in Clark's tabulations on his map drawings and in his list of "Creeks and Rivers." Clark's map for this area has the entry "Yorks 8 Islands," and under related remarks in Clark's "Creeks and Rivers" is "W.C. on land York tired."

On Wednesday, July 24, 1805, Meriwether Lewis made the following journal entry, which describes his thoughts about the formation of Yorks Islands:

we saw many beaver and some otter today; the former dam up the small channels of the river between the islands and compell the river in these parts to make other channels; which as soon as it has effected that which was stopped by the beaver becomes dry and is filled up with mud sand gravel and driftwood. the beaver is then compelled to seek another spot for his habitation wher[e] he again erects his dam. thus the river in many places among the clusters of islands is constantly changing the direction of such sluices as the beaver are capable of stoping or of 20 yds in width. this anamal in that way I believe to be very instrumental in adding to the number of islands with which we find the river crouded.

The captains followed the practice of naming geographic features after prominent persons who somehow had been connected with the expedition, particularly the President and members of his cabinet, (viz Jefferson, Madison, and Gallatin Rivers) or attributes of President Jefferson (viz. Philanthropy, Philosophy, and Wisdom Rivers). In addition, as far as can be determined, a geographic feature was named for every Corps member, including Seaman, Lewis's Newfoundland dog.

In 1806, on the return leg of the expedition down the Yellowstone River, Clark also named another geographical feature for York, "York's Dry Creek", a tributary of the Yellowstone River in Custer County, Montana. This name did not stick, however, and the creek became known as "Custer Creek".

== Official recognition of nomenclature "Yorks Islands" ==
Though the name for "Yorks 8 Islands" appears on Clark's 1805 maps of the expeditions travel along the Missouri for July 24, 1805, the geographical designation for "Yorks Islands" was not officially confirmed until 2000, when the U.S. Board on Geographic Names approved the name Yorks Islands for the group of Missouri River islands in Broadwater County. The name was also approved by the Montana Board on Geographic Names and has been entered into the Nation's official automated geographic names repository. The USGS (United States Geological Survey) Geographic Names Information System has settled on "Yorks Islands". However, the area is also called "York's Islands", or simply "York Island".

== Designation of "York's Islands Fishing Access Site" ==
The island group are now incorporated into "York's Islands Fishing Access Site", maintained by the Montana Fish, Wildlife and Parks Department. This site is located on 22 acres along the east side of Missouri River 4 miles south of Townsend. The site is just off of U.S. Highway 287. The site is marked by a Montana Fish and Wildlife Department sign. It includes a boat launch, picnic tables, fishing access, camping sites (including some for small trailers) and toilets. There is a small fee. There is no water or any other services.

== See also ==
- York (explorer)
- Lewis and Clark Expedition
- William Clark (explorer)
- Meriwether Lewis
- Broadwater County, Montana
- Missouri River
- Custer Creek train wreck
