= Torch Song (sculpture) =

Artwork by Alison Saar in Chicago, Illinois, U.S.

- The sculpture in 2026
- Artist: Alison Saar
- Location: Chicago, Illinois, U.S.; 41°47′12.6″N 87°35′7.3″W

Torch Song is a sculpture by Alison Saar, installed at the Barack Obama Presidential Center in Chicago, Illinois, United States. Inspired by the Statue of Liberty, the bronze sculpture depicts a woman holding a gilded flame. The work is located in the Women's Garden and was among the last to be finalized for the campus. The Chicago Sun-Times has said it "manages to evoke both the city's blues tradition and the Statue of Liberty with her flame". Vogue said the work "reimagines the Statue of Liberty through the lens of blues music and Black womanhood". Palisades News said the artwork "embodies the Center's mission to inspire hope and democratic ideals". According to the Obama Foundation, Saar creation the statue "as a symbol of resistance and speaking truth".

== See also ==
- Statue of Liberty in popular culture
