= York: Terra Incognita =

Statue in Portland, Oregon, U.S.

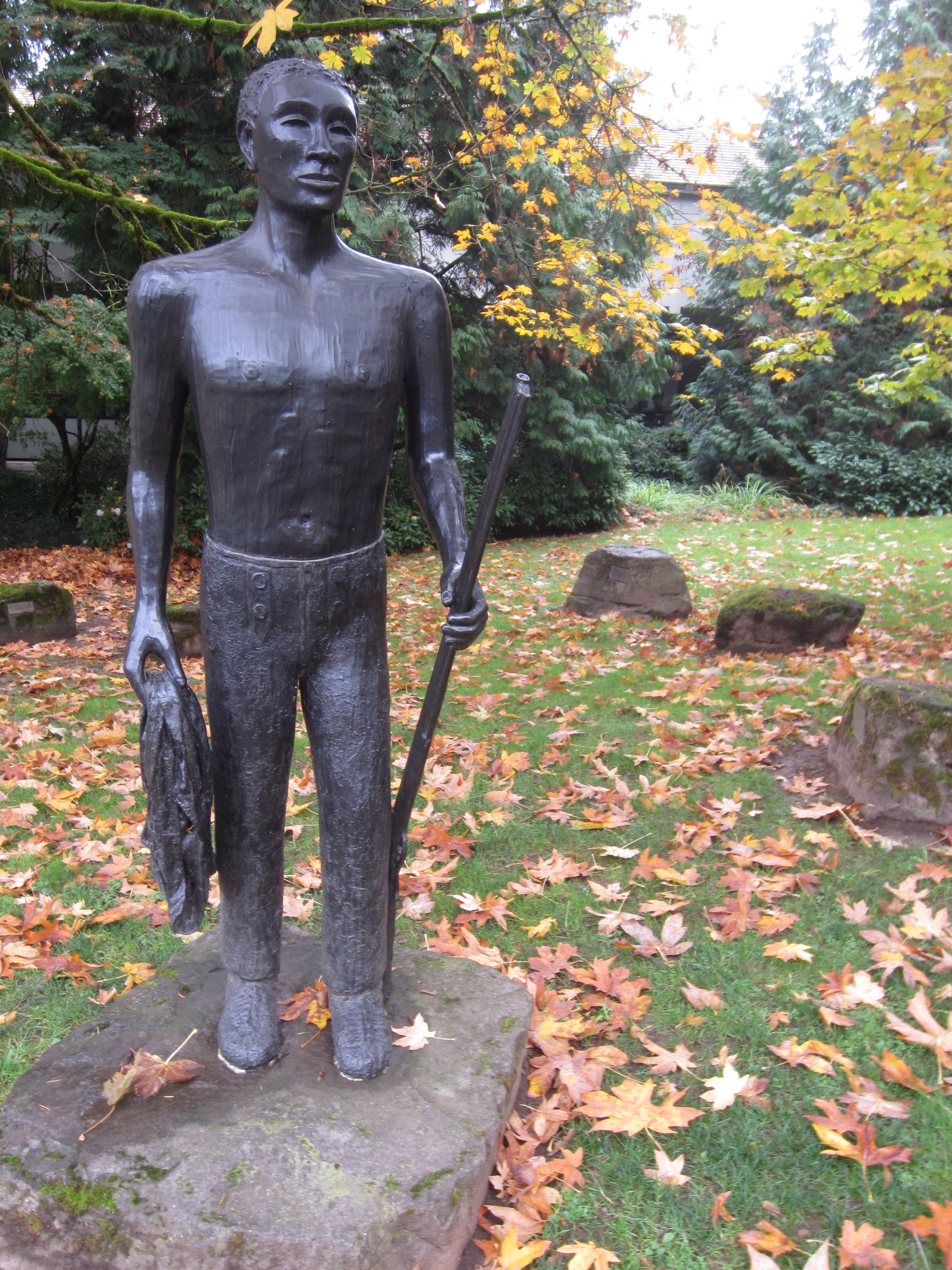
- The statue in 2017
- Artist: Alison Saar
- Year: 2010
- Medium: Brass sculpture
- Subject: York
- Location: Portland, Oregon, United States
- 45.45097°N 122.66974°W

York: Terra Incognita is an outdoor monument by Alison Saar, installed near the Aubrey Watzek Library on the Lewis & Clark College campus, in Portland, Oregon. The brass sculpture commemorates York, an African-American explorer best known for his participation with the Lewis and Clark Expedition, and was dedicated on May 8, 2010. The 6-foot (1.8 m) statue rests on an approximately 2-foot (0.61 m) bronze base.

== See also ==
- 2010 in art
- Captain William Clark Monument, University of Portland
