= Alison Saar =

African American artist

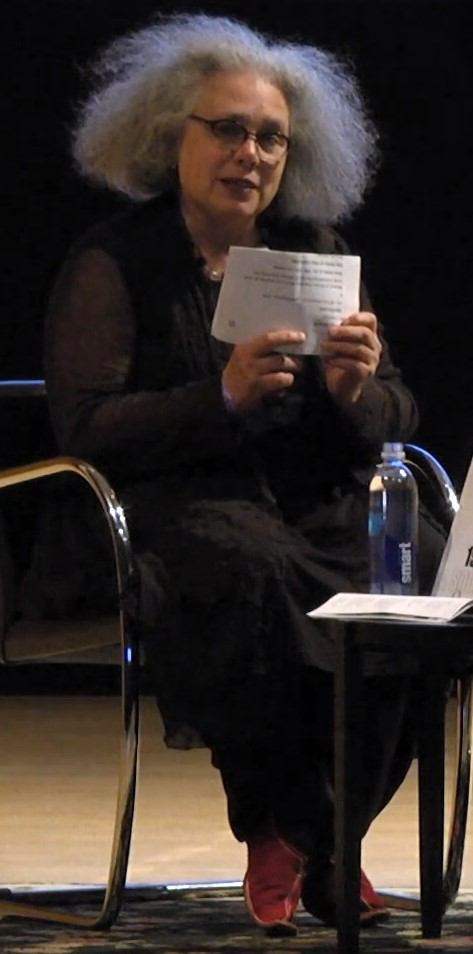
- Saar discusses her work at the Brooklyn Museum in 2017
- Born: February 5, 1956 (age 70); Los Angeles, California, U.S.
- Education: Scripps College; Otis College of Art and Design
- Spouse: Tom Leeser
- Children: 2

Alison Saar (born February 5, 1956) is a Los Angeles-based sculptor, mixed-media, and installation artist. Her artwork focuses on the African diaspora and black female identity and is influenced by African, Caribbean, and Latin American folk art and spirituality. Saar is well known for "transforming found objects to reflect themes of cultural and social identity, history, and religion." Saar credits her parents, collagist and assemblage artist Betye Saar (née Brown) and painter and art conservator Richard Saar, for her early exposure to art and to these metaphysical and spiritual practices. Saar followed in her parents' footsteps along with her sisters, Lezley Saar and Tracye Saar-Cavanaugh, who are also artists. Saar has been a practicing artist for many years, exhibiting in galleries around the world as well as installing public art works in New York City. She has received achievement awards from institutions, including the New York City Art Commission and the Institute of Contemporary Art in Boston.

== Early life and education ==
Saar was born in Los Angeles, California, to a well-known African-American sculptor and installation artist, Betye Saar, and Richard Saar, a ceramicist and art conservator. Saar's mother Betye was involved in the 1970s Black Arts Movement and frequently took Alison and her sisters, Lezley and Tracye, to museums and art openings during their childhood. They also saw Outsider Art, such as Simon Rodia's Watts Towers in Los Angeles and Grandma Prisbrey's Bottle Village in Simi Valley. Saar's love of nature, intense interest in vernacular folk art and admiration of artists' ability to create beauty through the use of discarded items stemmed from her upbringing and exposure to these experiences and types of art. Alison worked with her father as a conservator for eight years, starting while she was still in high school. This is where she learned to carve, and she notes that it later influenced the materials she would use in her pieces. Dealing with artifacts from different cultures‍—‌Chinese frescoes, Egyptian mummies, and Pre-Columbian and African art‍—‌taught Alison about properties of various materials, techniques, and aesthetics. Family has continued to play a large role in Saar's work ranging from her inspiration to her process. In the words of author and interviewer Hadley Roach, "In Saar’s life, the kitchen table is the easel, the children are the assistants, and driftwood is periodically dragged in from the backyard to become somebody’s legs."

Saar received a dual degree in art history and fine arts from Scripps College (Claremont, CA) in 1978, having studied with Dr. Samella Lewis. After finishing her degrees Saar felt more compelled to pursue being an artist rather than studying art. Her thesis focused on African-American folk art. She received an MFA from Otis College of Art and Design (Los Angeles, CA) in 1981. While studying at Otis College of Art and Design, Saar created pieces with fiber art that referenced Mark Rothko and Tantric Art. She came to realize that she wanted to change her art form to something that was more expressive and engaging. In addition to their distinguished separate careers Saar and her mother Betye Saar have produced artworks together, such as House of Gris Gris (1989). From her mother Alison "inherited a fascination with mysticism, found objects, and the spiritual potential of art."

== Early career ==
In 1981, after graduating from Otis College of Art and Design, Saar and her husband, Tom Leeser, moved to New York City. Together, they transformed a warehouse space in Chelsea into a loft apartment, and the tin tiles she found inside their apartment and other 19th- and early 20th-century buildings became a recurrent image in her sculptural works afterward.

In 1983, Saar was an artist in residence in Harlem at the Studio Museum. She took had another residency in New Mexico in 1985. There, she integrated both her urban style with Southwest Native American and Mexican influences.

Saar lived in New York for 15 years, had two children, Kyle and Maddy and moved back to Los Angeles, where she currently lives.

== Work ==
Snake Man, color woodcut and lithograph by Saar, 1994, Honolulu Museum of Art

Saar is skilled in numerous artistic mediums, including metal sculpture, wood, fresco, woodblock print, and works using found objects. Her sculptures and installations explore themes of African cultural diaspora and spirituality. Her work is often autobiographical and often acknowledges the historical role of the body as a marker of identity, and the body's connection to contemporary identity politics. Snake Man (1994), in the collection of the Honolulu Museum of Art, is an example of how the artist references both African culture and the human body in her work. The artist's multiethnic upbringing, multiracial identity and her studies of Latin American, Caribbean and African art and religion have informed her work. Saar investigates practices of Candomblé, Santería, and Hoodoo. Believing that objects contain spirits, she transforms familiar found objects to stir human emotions.

Her highly personal, often life-sized sculptures are marked by their emotional candor, and by contrasting materials and messages she imbues her work with a high degree of cultural subtext. When asked about the motivation behind her practice of utilizing found materials she states "I’ve never really thought of my printmaking as political but very much about it being populist, accessible and affordable. I love the history of broadsides where people would print out a poem and plaster the city with them, and I’ve done a couple with poets."

Saar's sculptures frequently represent issues relating to gender and race through both her personal experience and historical context. Many of Saar's work include messages and themes of the history of African Americans. Her 2018 exhibit, Topsy Turvy, references the character Topsy in Harriet Beecher Stowe's novel Uncle Tom's Cabin, a longstanding racial stereotype. Saar reimagines Stowe's stereotype as a symbol of resilience and resistance instead, a character transformed through love after experiencing the vicious treatment of enslavement that left her cold and heartless.

Saar has identified her artwork with the intention of emotional evocation but has not identified her work as directly political. However, In a review of the 1993 Whitney Biennial, New York Times art critic Roberta Smith said that Saar's work was among the "few instances where the political and visual join forces with real effectiveness." Some of Saar's works directly reference contemporary issues, such Rise (2020), as an ode to the Black Lives Matter Movement in the collection of the Whitney Museum of American Art in New York. Of Saar's 2006 exhibition Coup, critic Rebecca Epstein wrote, “[Saar] demonstrates deft skill with seemingly unforgiving materials (bronze, lead, tar, wood). [She] juggles themes of personal and cultural identity as she fashions various sizes of female bodies (often her own) that are buoyant with story while solid in stance.”

=== Public installations ===
Saar has created several public works throughout the course of her career. One of her most publicized works of the early 2000s includes a memorial to Harriet Tubman titled Swing Low. This piece is located in Harriet Tubman Memorial Plaza, South Harlem, at the intersection of St. Nicholas Ave and Fredrick Douglas Boulevard on W 122nd Street. Saar is quoted describing her intentions for Tubman's representation within the work, stating that she depicted Tubman "not as the conductor of the Railroad but as the train itself, an unstoppable locomotive".

A 2011 public collection of her works on display in Madison Square Park titled "Seasons" includes the individual pieces Spring, Fall, Winter, and Summer. Throughout these pieces Saar infused pomegranates into her imagery to reiterate the themes of Greek mythology that frame this work's creation. Inspired by the story of Demeter and Persephone, Saar incorporates the tale's motifs into her series of seasons.

The opening of the Paris Summer Olympics in 2024 marked the unveiling of a new public artwork by Saar in the Charles-Aznavour Garden on the city’s Avenue des Champs-Élysées. The monument, titled The Salon, depicts a Black woman holding an olive branch and a golden flame, surrounded by a circle of chairs that viewers are welcome to sit upon. It is meant to represent peace, as well as the power of women.

=== Themes ===
There are several reoccurring themes in Saar's oeuvre including those of mythology, girlhood, and familial relations. In an interview with New York Times magazine Saar discussed her relationship with the Yoruba goddess of childbirth and rivers—Yemoja: "Yemoja crops up in my work a lot. I first discovered her when I was living in New York in the 1990s, trying to grapple with being a young mother and having a career — it felt like a real balancing act. I did a piece then called “Cool Maman,” who is balancing actual pots and pans on her head, all white enamelware. I see Yemoja as not only helping me in terms of patience and balance and child rearing but also as a watery, life-giving spirit who nourishes my creative process."

Blank eyes rendered without pupils are a consistent visual motif across Saar’s print and sculptural work. Saar spoke directly to this as part of a touring retrospective of her print work titled “Mirror, Mirror.” At an artist talk at the Weatherspoon Art Museum in 2019 Saar noted that the blank (often fully white) eyes are “kind of masks in some sort of way,” a strategy for maintaining dignity during enslavement. For Saar, the pupil-less eyes are a way of denying the viewer’s satisfaction through refusal. Her figures do not return the gaze as a mode of control “in times of unimaginable degradation.” The exhibition's name also points to one of Saar’s preoccupations in the printmaking process. To make a print, she asserts, one must render the image in reverse. For Saar, “There are these dual worlds that simultaneously exist.” Deeply knowledgeable of African-diaspora spiritualisms, mirrors function for Saar as a kind of portal, “an invitation to spirit… revealing things we may not be able to see with the naked eye.”

== Personal life ==
Saar is married to Tom Leeser, also an artist, and they have two children. Her daughter, Maddy Inez, is a ceramist like her grandfather, Richard Saar.

== Exhibitions ==
Undone (2012), National Museum of Women in the Arts, Washington, D.C.

Saar's work has been exhibited in museums, biennials, galleries, and public art venues. Saar's work has been exhibited internationally with key exhibitions at the UCLA Fowler Museum of Cultural History, L.A. Louver Gallery, Phyllis Kind Gallery in New York City, Ben Maltz Gallery, and Pasadena Museum of California Art. She was an artist-in-residence at Dartmouth College and at The Studio Museum in Harlem. Her solo institutional exhibitions include: Directions at the Hirshhorn Museum and Sculpture Garden in 1993. Alison Saar: Bearing at the Museum of the African Diaspora in 2015-16; Winter at The Fields Sculpture Park, Omi International Arts Center in 2014-15; Hothouse at the Watts Towers Art Center in 2014-15; and STILL... that opened at the Ben Maltz Gallery, Otis College of Art and Design in 2012 and traveled to the Figge Art Museum, Massachusetts College of Art and Design in 2013.

Significant group exhibitions include: In Profile: Portraits from the Permanent Collection at The Studio Museum in Harlem in 2015; African American Art since 1950: Perspectives from the David C. Driskell Center, a traveling exhibition and catalogue that was presented at the University of Maryland in 2012, Taft Museum of Art in 2013, Harvey B. Gantt Center in 2014, Figge Art Museum in 2014-15, Polk Museum of Art in 2015, and Sheldon Museum of Art in 2016. Made in California: Art, Image, and Identity, 1900-2000 a large survey exhibition and catalogue produced Los Angeles County Museum of Art in 2000; Twentieth Century American Sculpture in the White House Garden at The White House, Washington, D.C., in 1995; and "Building on the Legacy: African American Art from the Permanent Collection" at the Muscarelle Museum of Art in Williamsburg, Virginia in 2018. In 2021, Saar curated SeenUNseen at L.A. Louver which coincided with a reading by Myriam J. A. Chancy.

An exhibition at the Ackland Art Museum titled Family Legacies: The Art of Betye, Lezley and Alison Saar featured Alison along with her mother and sister. This exhibition showcased work from all three artists spanning over 40 years and included fifty mixed media pieces. The overlying themes of the collection were displayed on the wall labels of certain works: "“art, family, and identity”; “interpreting stereotypes and offering alternative histories”; “reconsidering slavery”; “interpreting mixed-race ancestry”; and “revealing the spirit through art.”". This exhibition was centered on the interconnected nature of family and art.

Saar's work Hi, Yella was included in the 1993 Whitney Biennial held at the Whitney Museum of American Art, a benchmark in American exhibitions for its critical tone and content.

In 2021, the Benton Museum of Art and Armory Center for the Arts surveyed her work in a joint exhibition titled "Alison Saar: Of Aether and Earthe".

Saar is represented by L.A. Louver in Venice, California and Galerie Lelong in Paris, France.

== Awards ==
- 1984: Artist Fellowship, National Endowment for the Arts; Artist in Residence, The Studio Museum in Harlem, New York City, New York
- 1985: Engelhard Award, Institute of Contemporary Art, Boston, MA; Artist in Residence, Roswell Museum of Art, Roswell, N.M; Artist, Fellowship, National Endowment for the Arts
- 1986: Artist in Residence, November, Washington Project for the Arts
- 1988: Artist Fellowship, National Endowment for the Arts
- 1989: Guggenheim Fellowship from the John Simon Guggenheim Memorial Foundation
- 1998: Joan Mitchell Foundation Award, New Orleans, LA
- 1998: Augustus St. Gaudens Memorial Foundation, Cornish, NH
- 1999: Distinguished Alumnus of the Year, Otis College of Art and Design, Los Angeles, CA
- 2000: Flintridge Foundation Awards for Visual Arts, Pasadena, CA
- 2003: Distinguished Alumna Award, Scripps College, Claremont, CA; Artist in residence, Hopkins Center, Dartmouth College, Hanover, New Hampshire
- 2004: Received the COLA Grant, Los Angeles, CA
- 2005: Excellence in Design Award by the New York City Art Commission, New York City, New York
- 2012: Fellow of United States Artists.
- 2013: Joan Mitchell Foundation, New York
- City of Los Angeles (C.O.L.A.) Artist Fellowship
- 2025: David C. Driskell Prize, High Museum of Art

== Collections ==
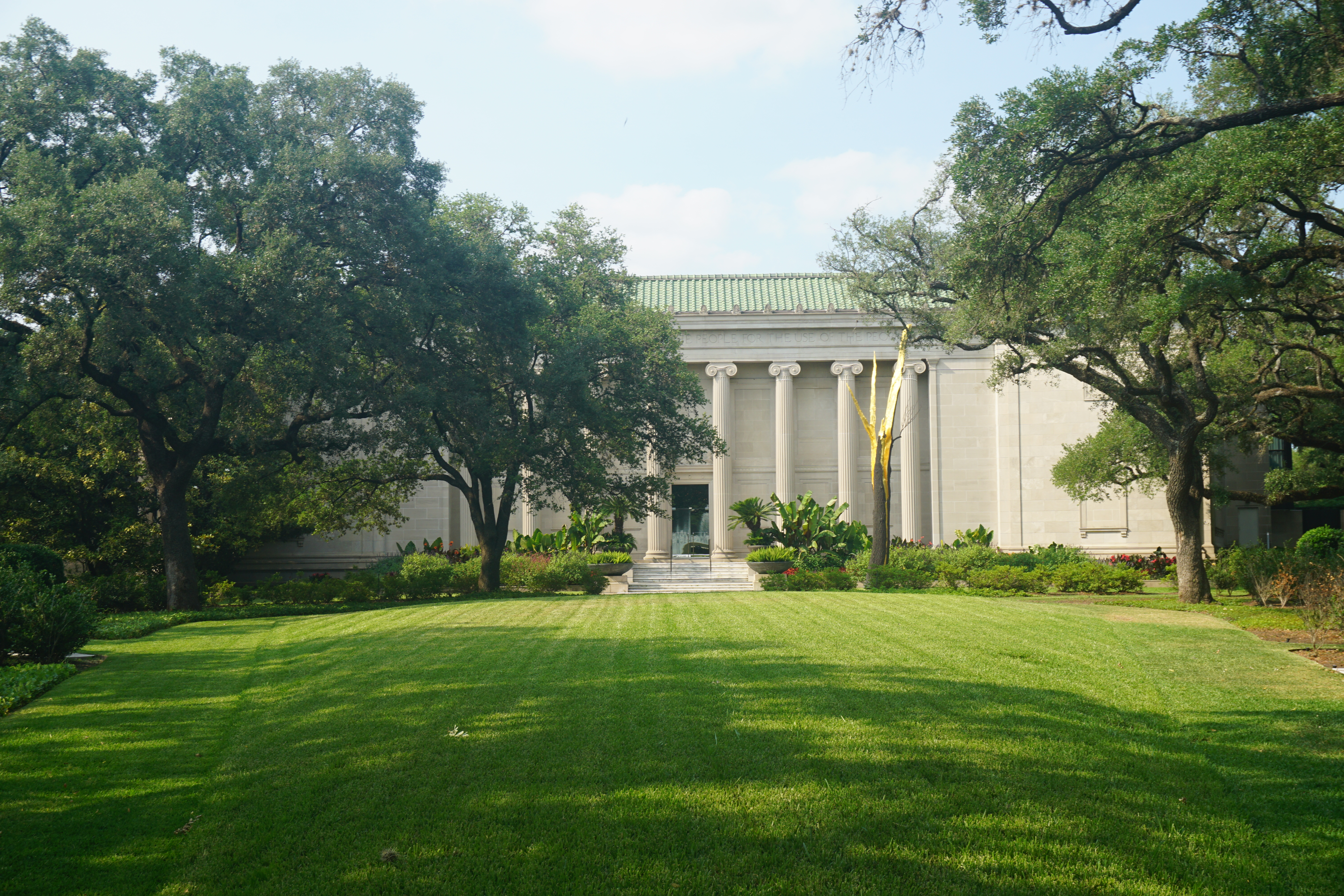
Museum of Fine Arts, Houston TX

- Museum of Modern Art, New York
- Indianapolis Museum of Art, Indianapolis, IN
- Museum of Fine Arts, Houston, TX
- Brooklyn Museum, Brooklyn, NY

== Publications ==
- Shepherd, Elizabeth. Secrets, Dialogues, Revelations: The Art of Betye and Alison Saar. Los Angeles, CA: Wight Art Gallery, University of California, 1990.
- Wilson, Judith. "Down to the Crossroads: The Art of Alison Saar." In Callaloo 14 no 1 (Winter 1991): 107–123.
- Krane, Susan. Art at the Edge, Alison Saar: Fertile Ground, Atlanta, GA: High Museum of Art, 1993.
- Nooter Roberts, Mary, and Alison Saar. Body Politics:The Female Image in Luba Art and the Sculpture of Alison Saar. UCLA Fowler Museum of Cultural History, 2000.
- McGee, Julie L. "Field, Boll, and Monument: Toward an Iconography of Cotton in African American Art." In International Review of African American Art 19 no. 1 (2003): 37–48.
- Lewis, Samella S. African American Art and Artists, revised and expanded 3rd ed., Berkeley: University of California Press, 2003.
- Farrington, Lisa E. "Reinventing Herself: The Black Female Nude." In Woman's Art Journal 24 no. 2 (Autumn 2003–Winter 2004): 15–23.
- Dallow, Jessica. "Reclaiming Histories: Betye and Alison Saar, Feminism, and the Representation of Black Womanhood." Feminist Studies 30 no. 1 (2004): 75–113.
- Dallow, Jessica. Family Legacies: The Art of Betye, Lezley, and Alison Saar. Chapel Hill: Ackland Art Museum, the University of North Carolina at Chapel Hill in association with University of Washington Press, 2005.
- Jones, Leisha. "Women and Abjection: Margins of Difference, Bodies of Art." Visual Culture & Gender 2 (2007): 62–71.
- Linton, Meg. Alison Saar: STILL .... Los Angeles, CA: Otis College of Art and Design, Ben Maltz Gallery, 2012.
- Dallow, Jessica. "Departures and Returns: Figuring the Mother's Body in the Art of Betye and Alison Saar." Reconciling Art and Mothering, edited by Rachel Epp Buller. Ashgate Publishing Company, 2012.

== See also ==
- Torch Song (sculpture), Chicago, Illinois
- York: Terra Incognita (2010), Lewis & Clark College, Portland, Oregon
