= Winston, Montana =

- Census-designated place
- Location of Winston, Montana
- Coordinates: 46°29′07″N 111°39′32″W
- Country: United States
- State: Montana
- County: Broadwater

Area
  - Total: 5.22 sq mi (13.52 km^{2})
  - Land: 5.22 sq mi (13.52 km^{2})
  - Water: 0 sq mi (0.00 km^{2})
- Elevation: 4,456 ft (1,358 m)

Population (2020)
  - Total: 169
  - Density: 32/sq mi (12.5/km^{2})
- Time zone: UTC-7 (Mountain (MST))
  - Summer (DST): UTC-6 (MDT)
- ZIP code: 59647
- Area code: 406
- FIPS code: 30-81175
- GNIS feature ID: 2409613

Winston is a census-designated place (CDP) in Broadwater County, Montana, United States. The population was 169 at the 2020 census, up from 147 in the 2010 census.

The town was named for the Winston brothers who hauled ore in the 1890s. The post office opened in 1892. A saloon was built in 1894 and the Durnens' Hotel shortly after.

The McMaster Ranch was started in 1893 and provided the area with a variety of meat for three generations. The ranch has retained most of its buildings and was listed on the National Register of Historic Places in 2021.

The Spokane Hill Airway Beacon is also on the register. The beacon was one of the chain of airway beacons pilots used to navigate in early aeronautic history. In the 1940s there were eighty-four beacons in the state. In 1972 the beacon system was officially abandoned.

== Geography ==
U.S. Highway 287 runs through the town. Canyon Ferry Lake is to the east.

According to the United States Census Bureau, the CDP has a total area of 5.2 square miles (13.5 km^{2}), all land.

=== Climate ===
According to the Köppen Climate Classification system, Winston has a semi-arid climate, abbreviated "BSk" on climate maps.

== Demographics ==
Historical population
Census	Pop.	Note	%±
2020	169		—
U.S. Decennial Census

As of the census of 2000, there were 73 people, 27 households, and 18 families residing in the CDP. The population density was 21.8 people per square mile (8.4/km^{2}). There were 30 housing units at an average density of 8.9 per square mile (3.4/km^{2}). The racial makeup of the CDP was 95.89% White, 1.37% Native American, 1.37% Asian, and 1.37% from two or more races.

There were 27 households, out of which 40.7% had children under the age of 18 living with them, 51.9% were married couples living together, 11.1% had a female householder with no husband present, and 33.3% were non-families. 25.9% of all households were made up of individuals, and 14.8% had someone living alone who was 65 years of age or older. The average household size was 2.70 and the average family size was 3.44.

In the CDP, the population was spread out, with 30.1% under the age of 18, 5.5% from 18 to 24, 26.0% from 25 to 44, 27.4% from 45 to 64, and 11.0% who were 65 years of age or older. The median age was 35 years. For every 100 females, there were 82.5 males. For every 100 females age 18 and over, there were 82.1 males.

The median income for a household in the CDP was $14,500, and the median income for a family was $56,250. Males had a median income of $35,683 versus $28,750 for females. The per capita income for the CDP was $18,846. None of the population and none of the families were below the poverty line.

== Education ==
All grades are within the Townsend School District. Broadwater High School had 196 students in the 2024-2025 school year. The team name is the Bulldogs.
