= Spokane Creek, Montana =

- Census-designated place
- Location within Montana
- Coordinates: 46°32′00″N 111°44′47″W
- Country: United States
- State: Montana
- County: Broadwater

Area
  - Total: 17.29 sq mi (44.79 km^{2})
  - Land: 17.29 sq mi (44.79 km^{2})
  - Water: 0 sq mi (0.00 km^{2})
- Elevation: 4,278 ft (1,304 m)

Population (2020)
  - Total: 430
  - Density: 25/sq mi (9.6/km^{2})
- Time zone: UTC-7 (Mountain (MST))
  - Summer (DST): UTC-6 (MDT)
- Area code: 406
- FIPS code: 30-69900
- GNIS feature ID: 2583849

Spokane Creek is a census-designated place (CDP) in Broadwater County, Montana, United States. As of the 2020 census, Spokane Creek had a population of 430.

== Geography ==
Radersburg is located in the northwest corner of Broadwater County, 14 miles (23 km) east of Helena, the state capital. 12/287 runs through the CDP, leading west to Helena and southeast 19 miles (31 km) to Townsend. Canyon Ferry Lake, a reservoir on the Missouri River, is 3 miles (5 km) to the east of the CDP.

According to the United States Census Bureau, the CDP has a total area of 17.3 square miles (44.8 km^{2}), all land.

== Demographics ==
Historical population
Census	Pop.	Note	%±
2020	430		—
U.S. Decennial Census

== Education ==
It is within the Townsend K-12 Schools school district.
