= Robert Scriver =

American sculptor

Robert Macfie Scriver (1914–1999) was a Montana sculptor who was born on the Blackfeet reservation of Anglophone Quebec parents. Scriver was a scholar of Blackfoot Indian culture and history who knew and associated with Blackfoot historian James Willard Schultz in the earlier part of his life.

He specialized in western subjects, but it is more accurate to associate him with the American Beaux Arts-educated sculptors who became prominent at the turn of the 19th century. His first efforts were small inexpensive souvenir wildlife figurines cast in plaster and air-brushed in natural colors. A parallel career in taxidermy and a fondness for hunting supported the increasingly accurate portrayals of these animals.

Entry into a statewide contest for a heroic-sized portrait of Charles M. Russell—a contest he failed to win—provided the impetus to become a "real" sculptor and attracted the support and guidance of Charlie Beil, a noted Canadian sculptor. Both men built foundries and cast their own bronzes, guaranteeing high quality. In the late 1950s the Blackfeet tribe and Scriver conferred about a series of bronzes to be cast in heroic size. These included "No More Buffalo," "Transition," and "The Return of the Blackfeet Raiders," which are some of his finest work. These pieces and others about the Blackfeet are shown in the book called "No More Buffalo." They were never enlarged.

About the same time a commission for five historical portraits of Western men with horses culminated in "Lone Cowboy," which was his trademark work for a long time. In the early Sixties he began to send bronzes to juried New York shows where they were accepted, earning him membership in the National Sculpture Society, the Salmagundi Club, the Society of Animal Artists and other prestigious groups. When the Cowboy Artists of America formed in Oklahoma, Scriver was invited to join them and then the National Academy of Western Art. With both groups he won top prizes.

In the mid-Sixties the Professional Rodeo Cowboys Association commissioned him to create a heroic-sized portrait of Bill Linderman, a famous champion. This was the beginning of a long association with the PRCA for whom he created many busts of outstanding people. Also, he embarked on a huge project: a large sculpture of each rodeo event plus portraits of representatives of participants, both animals and people. "An Honest Try," a bullrider, became his new trademark and the name of a book about these sculptures. A one-and-a-half lifesized version of the sculpture stands in Kansas City.

At about this time his daughter died of cancer. A commission for a crucifix was followed by a Pieta expressing Scriver's grief. Portraits of his daughter and of the siblings of his second wife were included in this small group of exceptional sculptures.

The Lewis and Clark Memorial by Bob Scriver, located in Fort Benton, Montana.

Somewhat later, coinciding with the opening of many small commercial ceramic-shell foundries that allowed inexpensive casting, Scriver began taking commissions for small sculptures, often on subjects suggested by entrepreneurs, which he sold with the right to reproduce. This was in part because his own health did not allow him to operate his foundry. Later, he found that David Cree Medicine could operate the foundry and that Gordon Monroe could create large fiberglass monumental sculpture. He rebuilt the small original foundry into a huge cinderblock facility.

In 1976 the town of Fort Benton commissioned a heroic-sized bronze group of Lewis and Clark with Sacajawea and her baby. This was echoed by Great Falls, whose group dropped out Sacajawea in favor of York and Seaman, Lewis' dog. By now a protocol had developed to produce small maquettes of the statue and sell them to finance the monuments. Scriver used this protocol to help save a Russell painting of an elk from being sold out-of-state.

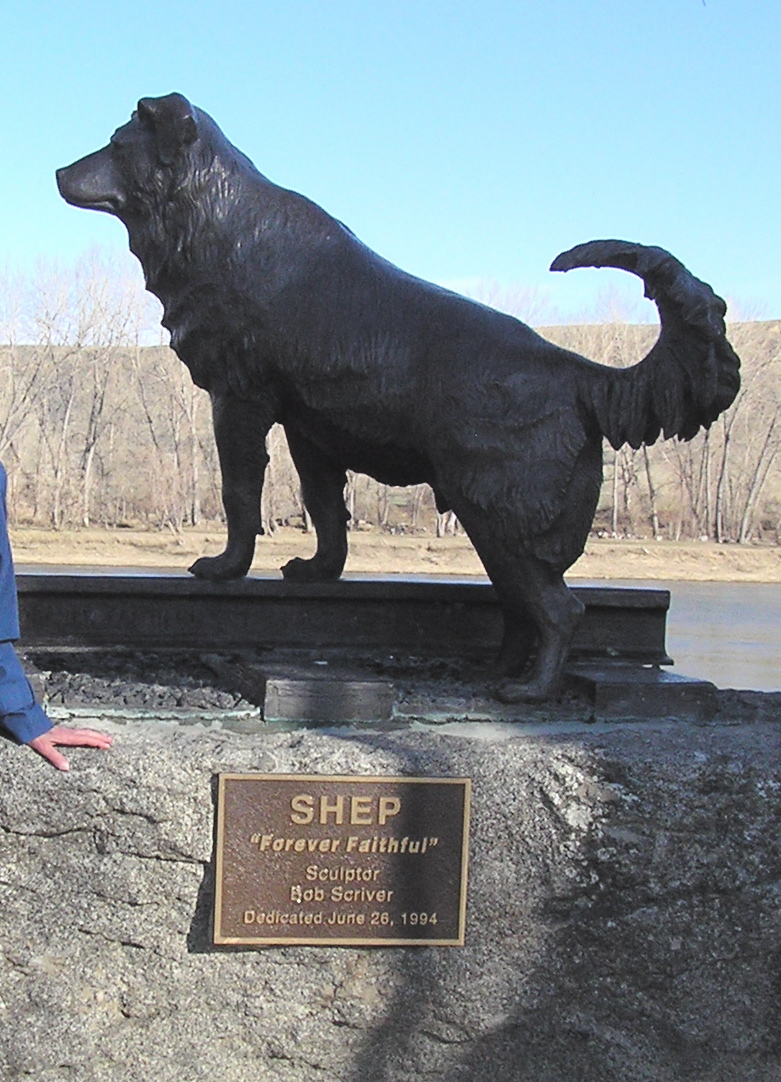
"Shep" by Bob Scriver, located in Fort Benton, Montana.

The Scriver family's collection of Blackfeet artifacts, which included a gun collection and historic RCMP uniforms, was sold to the Royal Alberta Museum in Edmonton, Alberta. The insurance valuation of the collections, a million dollars, was leaked to Blackfeet activists and caused a national uproar because ceremonial Bundles were included. Later, Premier Klein of Alberta returned those sacred objects to Canadian Blackfeet.

In Browning, Montana, Scriver operated the "Museum of Montana Wildlife" and "Hall of Bronze". After the artist's death, these two collections were given to the Montana Historical Society in Helena, Montana. They have never been unpacked or displayed except as loans to other museums. The full-mount animals were put in the custody of the Rocky Mountain Elk Foundation where they joined many others and are occasionally displayed. Scriver's ranch became a nature refuge under the guardianship of the Blackfeet Land Trust and Nature Conservancy. The shell of the Scriver museum in Browning is now the home of The Blackfeet Heritage Center.

In 2008, the University of Calgary Press published "Bronze Inside and Out: a Biographical Memoir of Bob Scriver" written by Mary Scriver, his third wife of four.
