= Broadwater County, Montana =

County in Montana, United States

- County
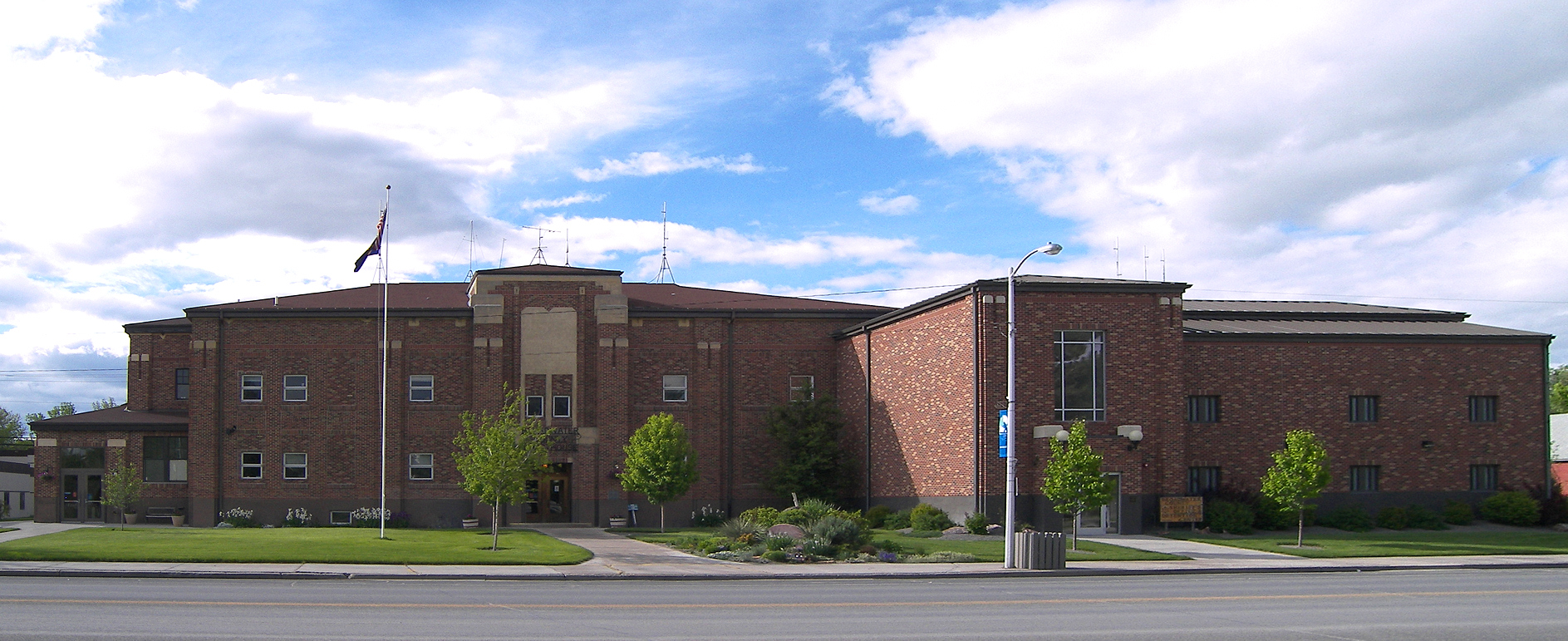
- The Broadwater County Courthouse in Townsend

- Location within the U.S. state of Montana
- Coordinates: 46°20′N 111°30′W
- Country: United States
- State: Montana
- Founded: 1897
- Named for: Charles Arthur Broadwater
- Seat: Townsend
- Largest city: Townsend

Area
  - Total: 1,239 sq mi (3,210 km^{2})
  - Land: 1,193 sq mi (3,090 km^{2})
  - Water: 46 sq mi (120 km^{2}) 3.7%

Population (2020)
  - Total: 6,774
  - Estimate (2025): 8,493 ▲
  - Density: 5.678/sq mi (2.192/km^{2})
- Time zone: UTC−7 (Mountain)
  - Summer (DST): UTC−6 (MDT)
- Congressional district: 2nd
- Website: www.broadwatercountymt.gov
- Montana county number 43

Broadwater County is a county in the U.S. state of Montana. As of the 2020 census, the population was 6,774. Its county seat is Townsend. The county was named for Charles Arthur Broadwater, a noted Montana railroad, real estate, and banking magnate.

== History ==
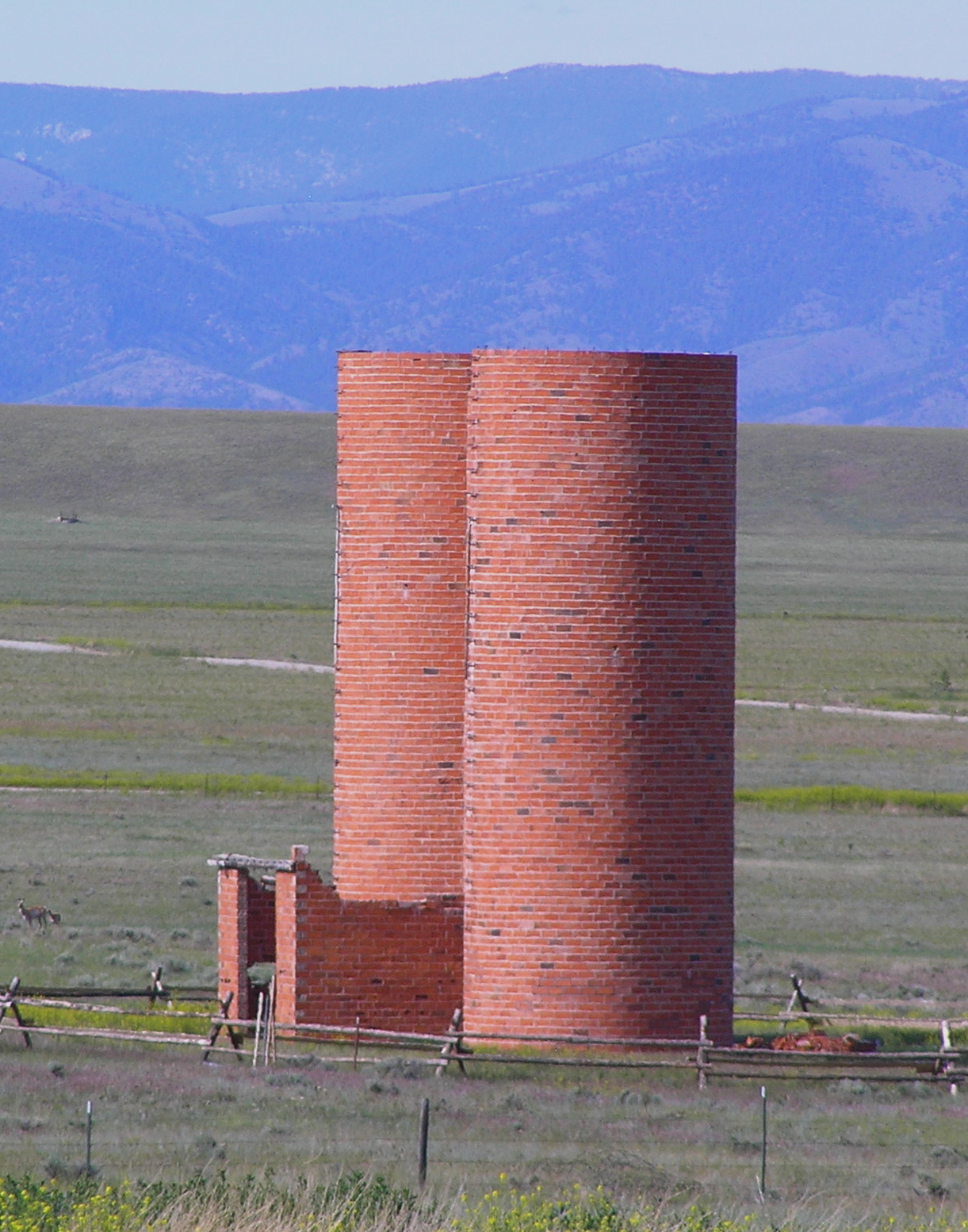
"The Silos" are a major Broadwater County landmark

The Lewis and Clark Expedition traveled through what is now Broadwater County as they traced the Missouri River. Gold was discovered in the Big Belt Mountains in 1864 which brought several mining towns. In 1881 the Northern Pacific Railway included a stop in what is now Townsend.

== Geography ==
According to the United States Census Bureau, the county has a total area of 1,239 square miles (3,210 km^{2}), of which 1,193 square miles (3,090 km^{2}) is land and 46 square miles (120 km^{2}) (3.7%) is water.

The boundaries of the county are roughly formed by the Big Belt Mountains to the east and north, the Elkhorn Mountains to the west, and the Horseshoe Hills to the south.

Broadwater County is perhaps best known as the home of Canyon Ferry Lake, the third largest body of water in Montana. The lake provides essential irrigation to local farms, and serves as a recreation destination for the region, with fishing, boating, swimming, camping, and wildlife viewing opportunities.

=== Major highways ===
- Interstate 90
- U.S. Highway 12
- U.S. Highway 287
- Montana Highway 2

=== Adjacent counties ===
- Meagher County - east
- Gallatin County - south
- Jefferson County - west
- Lewis and Clark County - northwest

=== National protected area ===
- Helena National Forest (part)

== Politics ==
United States presidential election results for Broadwater County, Montana
Year	Republican		Democratic		Third party(ies)	
Year	No.	%	No.	%	No.	%
1904	392	44.90%	403	46.16%	78	8.93%
1908	326	37.86%	495	57.49%	40	4.65%
1912	205	21.97%	451	48.34%	277	29.69%
1916	584	33.45%	1,100	63.00%	62	3.55%
1920	723	51.50%	622	44.30%	59	4.20%
1924	531	37.71%	486	34.52%	391	27.77%
1928	743	52.51%	663	46.86%	9	0.64%
1932	512	33.71%	988	65.04%	19	1.25%
1936	502	31.43%	1,071	67.06%	24	1.50%
1940	755	46.81%	854	52.94%	4	0.25%
1944	760	57.45%	558	42.18%	5	0.38%
1948	704	55.61%	536	42.34%	26	2.05%
1952	962	68.86%	435	31.14%	0	0.00%
1956	869	65.93%	449	34.07%	0	0.00%
1960	680	51.87%	631	48.13%	0	0.00%
1964	609	50.58%	595	49.42%	0	0.00%
1968	671	54.29%	439	35.52%	126	10.19%
1972	916	66.57%	411	29.87%	49	3.56%
1976	820	59.04%	557	40.10%	12	0.86%
1980	1,052	67.26%	401	25.64%	111	7.10%
1984	1,345	73.50%	458	25.03%	27	1.48%
1988	1,054	62.63%	592	35.18%	37	2.20%
1992	830	45.06%	491	26.66%	521	28.28%
1996	1,029	52.34%	603	30.67%	334	16.99%
2000	1,488	71.75%	462	22.28%	124	5.98%
2004	1,778	75.47%	533	22.62%	45	1.91%
2008	1,875	66.80%	857	30.53%	75	2.67%
2012	2,152	71.47%	764	25.37%	95	3.16%
2016	2,348	74.94%	573	18.29%	212	6.77%
2020	3,173	77.45%	835	20.38%	89	2.17%
2024	3,770	78.38%	885	18.40%	155	3.22%

== Demographics ==
Historical population
Census	Pop.	Note	%±
1900	2,641		—
1910	3,491		32.2%
1920	3,239		−7.2%
1930	2,738		−15.5%
1940	3,451		26.0%
1950	2,922		−15.3%
1960	2,804		−4.0%
1970	2,526		−9.9%
1980	3,267		29.3%
1990	3,318		1.6%
2000	4,385		32.2%
2010	5,612		28.0%
2020	6,774		20.7%
2025 (est.)	8,493	▲	25.4%
U.S. Decennial Census; 1790–1960, 1900–1990, 1990–2000, 2010–2020

=== 2020 census ===
As of the 2020 census, the county had a population of 6,774.

Of the residents, 21.6% were under the age of 18 and 22.6% were 65 years of age or older; the median age was 45.7 years. For every 100 females there were 107.5 males, and for every 100 females age 18 and over there were 107.8 males.

0.0% of residents lived in urban areas and 100.0% lived in rural areas.

The racial makeup of the county was 91.9% White, 0.3% Black or African American, 0.9% American Indian and Alaska Native, 0.1% Asian, 0.6% from some other race, and 6.3% from two or more races. Hispanic or Latino residents of any race comprised 3.0% of the population.

There were 2,795 households in the county, of which 27.3% had children under the age of 18 living with them and 16.2% had a female householder with no spouse or partner present. About 26.0% of all households were made up of individuals and 12.4% had someone living alone who was 65 years of age or older.

There were 3,172 housing units, of which 11.9% were vacant. Among occupied housing units, 80.4% were owner-occupied and 19.6% were renter-occupied. The homeowner vacancy rate was 1.6% and the rental vacancy rate was 4.6%.

=== 2010 census ===
As of the 2010 census, there were 5,612 people, 2,347 households, and 1,614 families living in the county. The population density was 4.7 inhabitants per square mile (1.8/km^{2}). There were 2,695 housing units at an average density of 2.3 units per square mile (0.89 units/km^{2}). The racial makeup of the county was 96.2% white, 1.3% American Indian, 0.3% black or African American, 0.2% Pacific islander, 0.2% Asian, 0.3% from other races, and 1.5% from two or more races. Those of Hispanic or Latino origin made up 2.2% of the population. In terms of ancestry, 38.7% were German, 16.2% were English, 15.5% were Irish, 7.9% were Norwegian, 6.4% were Scottish, and 2.3% were American.

Of the 2,347 households, 27.5% had children under the age of 18 living with them, 58.7% were married couples living together, 6.2% had a female householder with no husband present, 31.2% were non-families, and 26.6% of all households were made up of individuals. The average household size was 2.37 and the average family size was 2.85. The median age was 45.4 years.

The median income for a household in the county was $44,667 and the median income for a family was $46,949. Males had a median income of $34,500 versus $32,014 for females. The per capita income for the county was $19,606. About 5.8% of families and 10.1% of the population were below the poverty line, including 10.0% of those under age 18 and 7.1% of those age 65 or over.

== Economy ==
Agriculture is one of the primary industries in Broadwater County. RY Timber and Wheat Montana Bakery were the largest private employers according to the 2000 Census.

== Communities ==
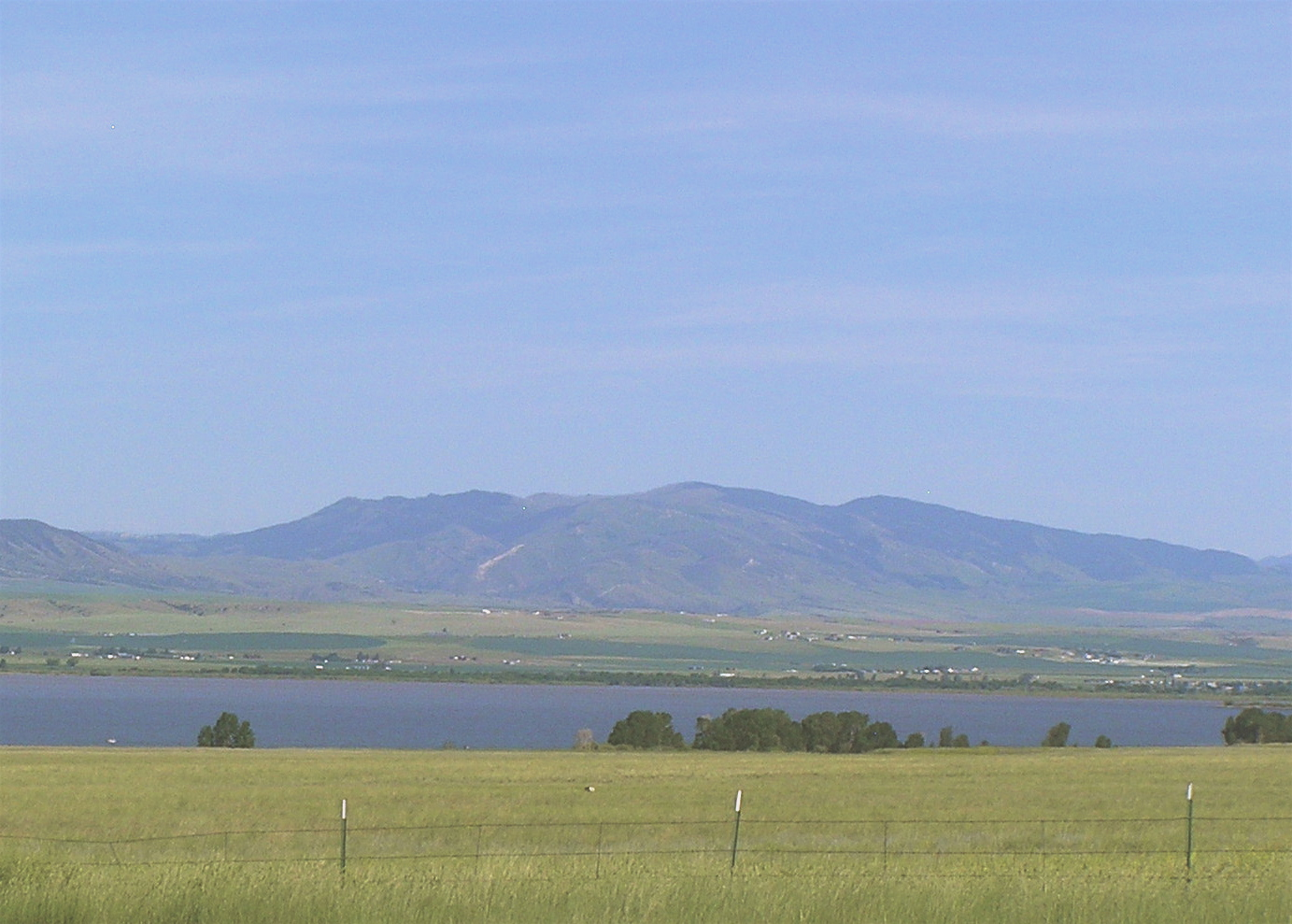
Canyon Ferry Reservoir and the Big Belt Mountains near Townsend

=== City ===
- Townsend (county seat)

=== Census-designated places ===
- Radersburg
- Spokane Creek
- The Silos
- Toston
- Wheatland
- Winston

=== Unincorporated communities ===
- Canton
- Copper City
- Diamond City
- Eustis
- Holker
- Lombard

=== Former communities ===
- Lombard

== Education ==
There are three school districts:

- Townsend K-12 Schools
- Three Forks Elementary School District
- Three Forks High School District

The elementary and high school district are both a part of Three Forks Public Schools.

== See also ==
- USS Broadwater (APA-139)
- List of lakes in Broadwater County, Montana
- List of mountains in Broadwater County, Montana
- National Register of Historic Places listings in Broadwater County MT
- Yorks Islands
