= The Silos, Montana =

- Census-designated place
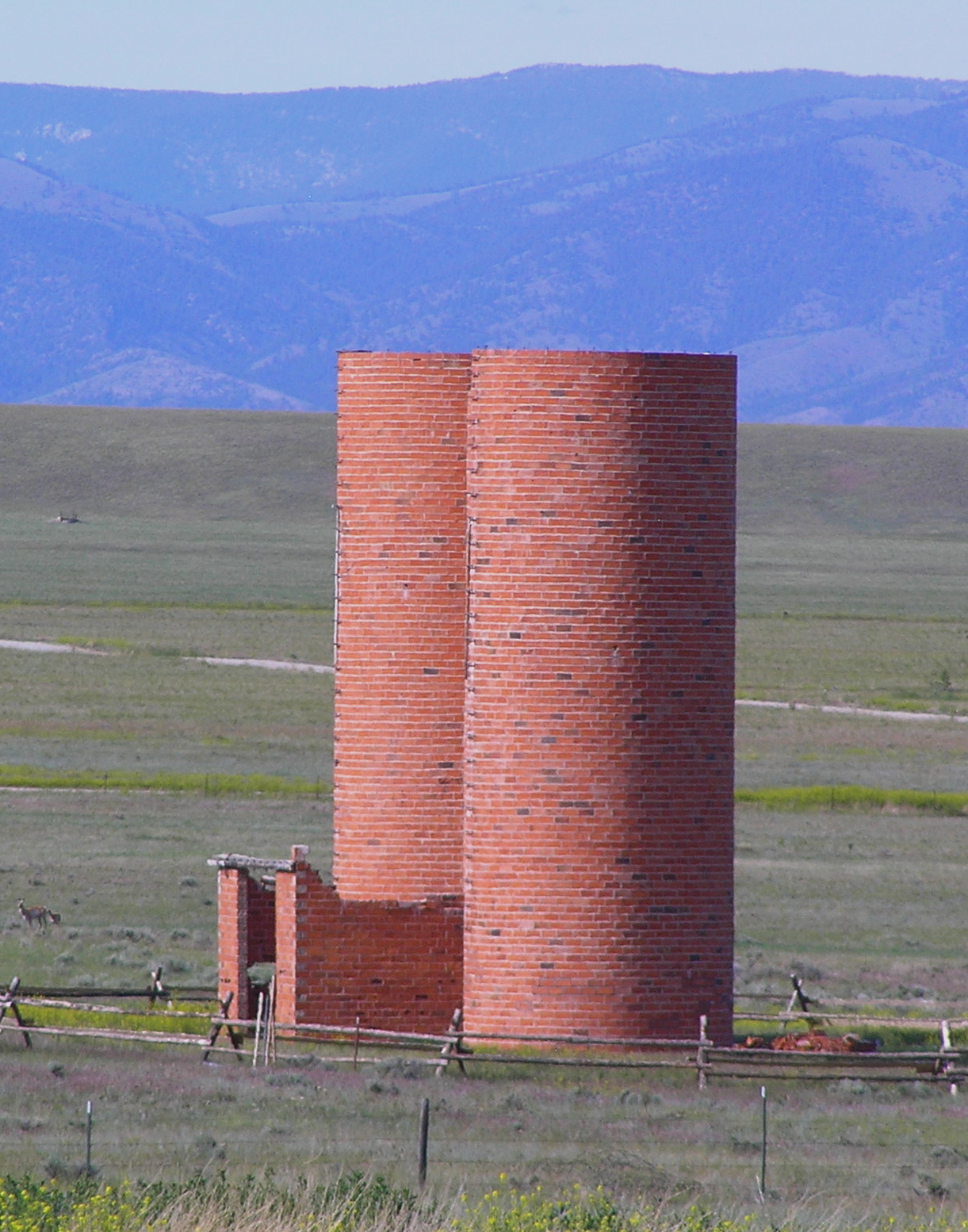
- The Silos

- Location within Montana
- Coordinates: 46°23′21″N 111°34′32″W
- Country: United States
- State: Montana
- County: Broadwater

Area
  - Total: 5.13 sq mi (13.29 km^{2})
  - Land: 5.13 sq mi (13.29 km^{2})
  - Water: 0 sq mi (0.00 km^{2})
- Elevation: 3,888 ft (1,185 m)

Population (2020)
  - Total: 691
  - Density: 134.7/sq mi (52.01/km^{2})
- Time zone: UTC-7 (Mountain (MST))
  - Summer (DST): UTC-6 (MDT)
- Area code: 406
- FIPS code: 30-73760
- GNIS feature ID: 2583858

The Silos is a census-designated place (CDP) in Broadwater County, Montana, United States. As of the 2020 census, The Silos had a population of 691.

== Geography ==
The Silos is located along the west shore of Canyon Ferry Lake, a reservoir on the Missouri River. U.S. 12/287 runs through the CDP, leading 5 miles (8 km) southeast to Townsend, the Broadwater County seat, and 28 miles (45 km) northwest to Helena, the state capital.

According to the United States Census Bureau, the CDP has a total area of 5.1 square miles (13.3 km^{2}), all land.

== Demographics ==
Historical population
Census	Pop.	Note	%±
2020	691		—
U.S. Decennial Census

== Education ==
It is within the Townsend K-12 Schools school district.
