= New York City Public Design Commission =

New York City government agency

Public Design Commission
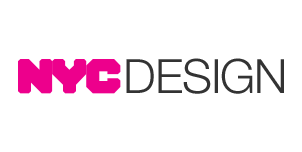

Commission overview
- Formed: 1898
- Jurisdiction: New York City
- Commission executives: Deborah Marton, President; Erich Bilal, Executive Director
- Key document: New York City Charter
- Website: www.nyc.gov/designcommission

The New York City Public Design Commission, previously the Municipal Art Commission, is the agency of the New York City government that reviews permanent works of architecture, landscape architecture, and art proposed on or over city-owned property.

The Art Commission was established in 1898, the same year as the consolidation of New York City, as a response to the City Beautiful Movement that sprung up around the time of the 1893 World's Columbian Exposition in Chicago. Its members were instrumental in the creation of the 1956 Bard Act. It fought the Robert Moses proposals to build a Brooklyn Battery Bridge and to demolish the Castle Clinton in the late 1930s and early 1940s. It was renamed by mayor Michael Bloomberg on July 21, 2008 as the Public Design Commission, except where the legal name "Art Commission" is required.

The Public Design Commission comprises 11 members who, by law, must include an architect, a landscape architect, a painter, a sculptor, and three lay members, as well as representatives of the Brooklyn Museum, the Metropolitan Museum of Art, the New York Public Library, and the Mayor of New York City.
