= Carl Friedrichs =

Carl Friedrichs may refer to:

- Carl C. Friedrichs, American lawyer, politician, and officer in the Spanish American War
- Carl Joseph Friedrichs (1831–1916), German printer, author and gold prospector
