= Columbarium (Cochem) =

Heritage-protected building in Cochem

Coordinates: 50.139116°N 7.171397°E

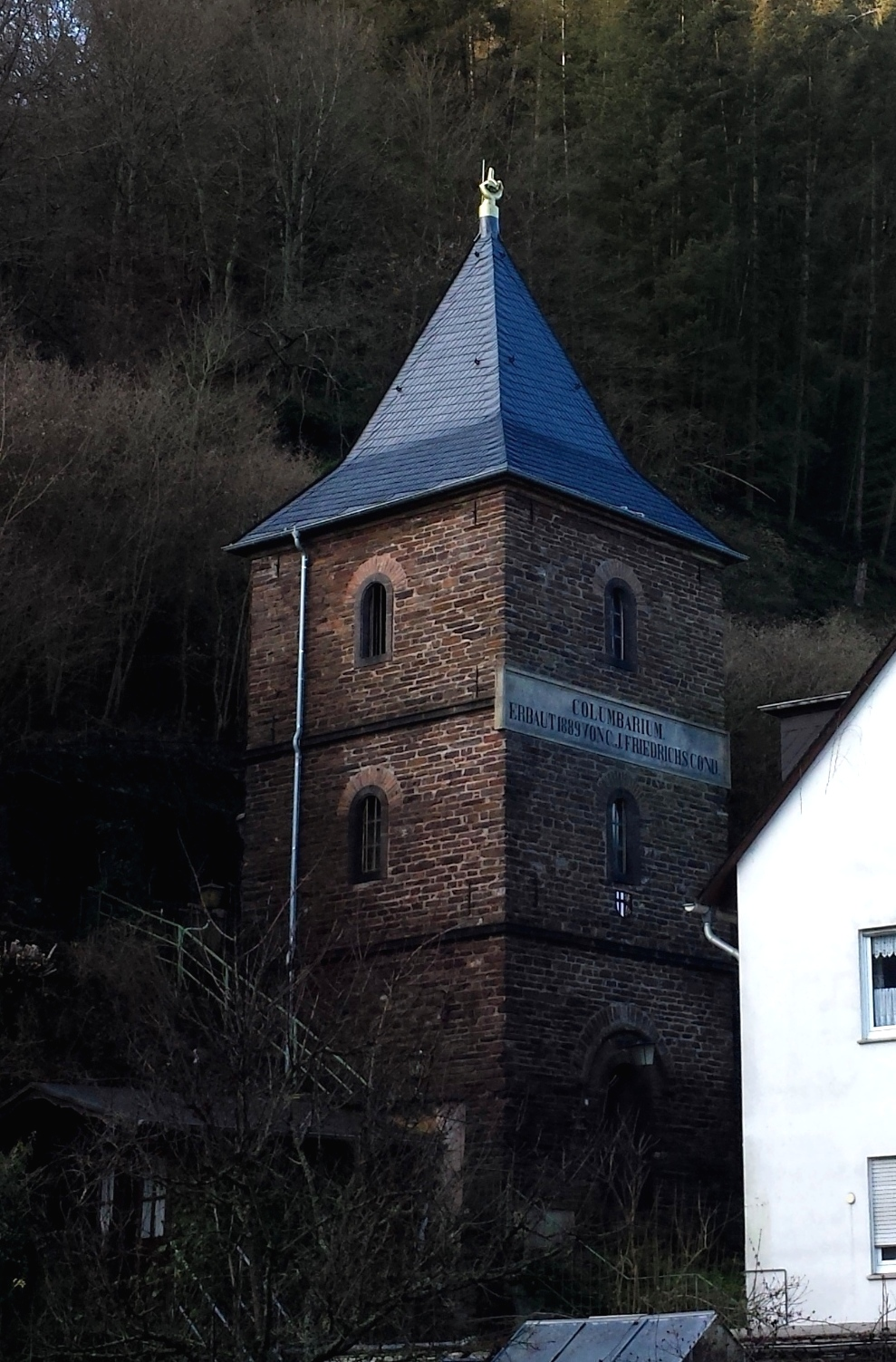
Columbarium in Cochem

The Columbarium is a heritage-protected building in Cochem. The three-storey tower is a massive Greywacke quarry stone building. The building was constructed between 1889 and 1890 according to the plans of master bricklayer Johann Wiss from Klotten, commissioned by Carl Joseph Friedrichs.

== History ==
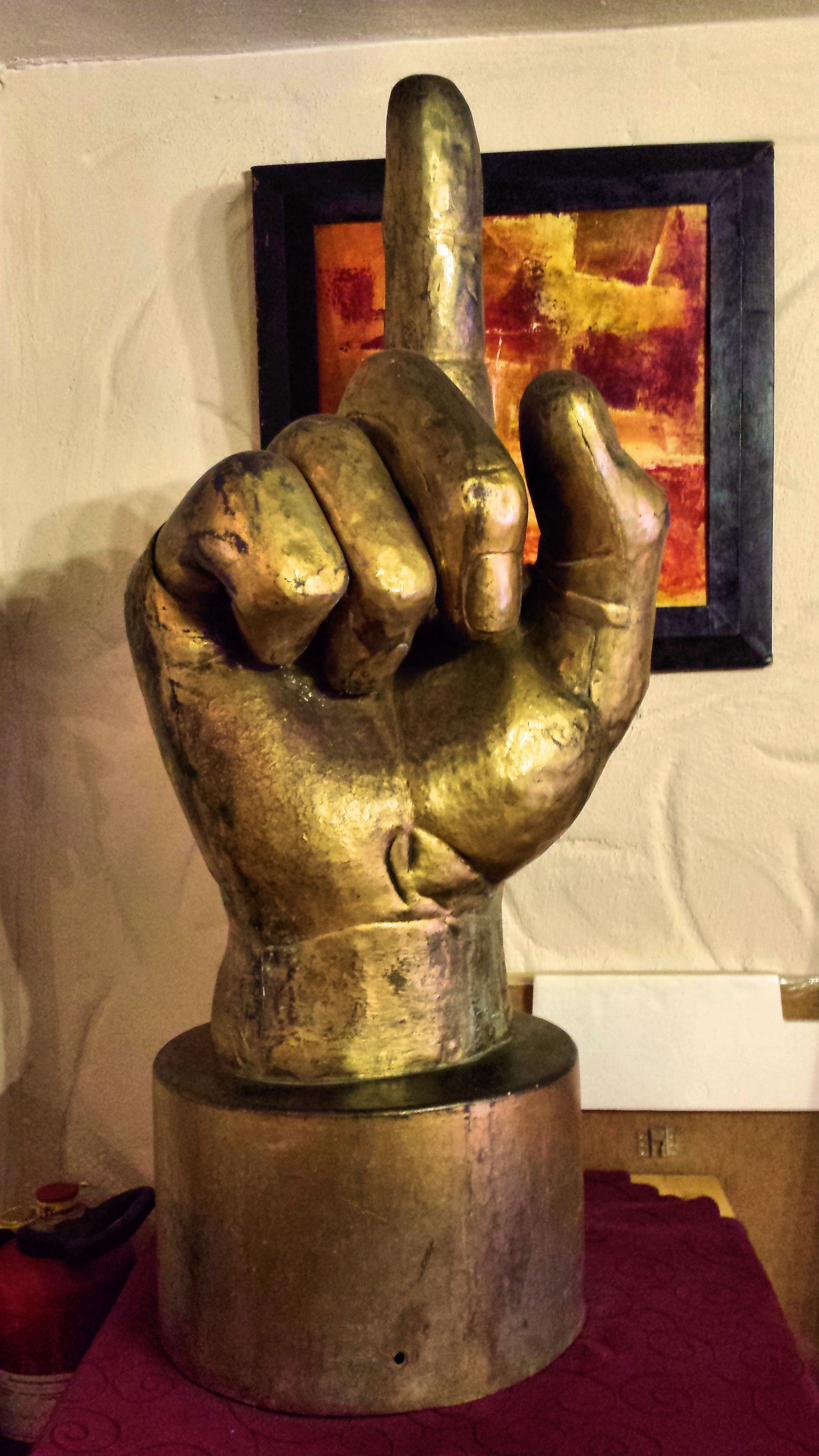
The so-called Mahnhand

The tower was built to order by Carl Joseph Friedrichs (1831-1916), who was born in Cochem-Cond. Friedrichs went from Wittlich to the United States in 1850 and became a wealthy Gold digger during the Montana Gold Rush, where he discovered the Montana Bar, only to return to Germany in 1866. Since December 16, 2019, the tower in the Oberer Weg 9 in Cochem has again been adorned by a pyramid roof covered with natural slate and the original "Mahnhand", which is believed to have been the case for the last time in the early 1930s.

The tower with its admonishing hand probably served as a reminder to his first wife Betty, née Hirsch (1850-1926) and one of her older brothers. The brother, Ferdinand Hirsch (* 1838), borrowed approx. 10,000 dollars from Friedrichs in Helena before his departure in September 1866, after he had made spectacular gold discoveries during the Montana Gold Rush in Diamond City. However, he never paid this money back. After his arrival in the winter of 1866, Friedrich went to his father Bernhard Hirsch (1807-1885) in Cochem to claim the money back. There he fell in love with his youngest daughter and married her. One day before the wedding on September 26, 1867, her father had presented the groom with a marriage contract for a "real estate complex" in Meiningen worth 90,000 marks, which he had acquired shortly before and which he had also signed without much thought.

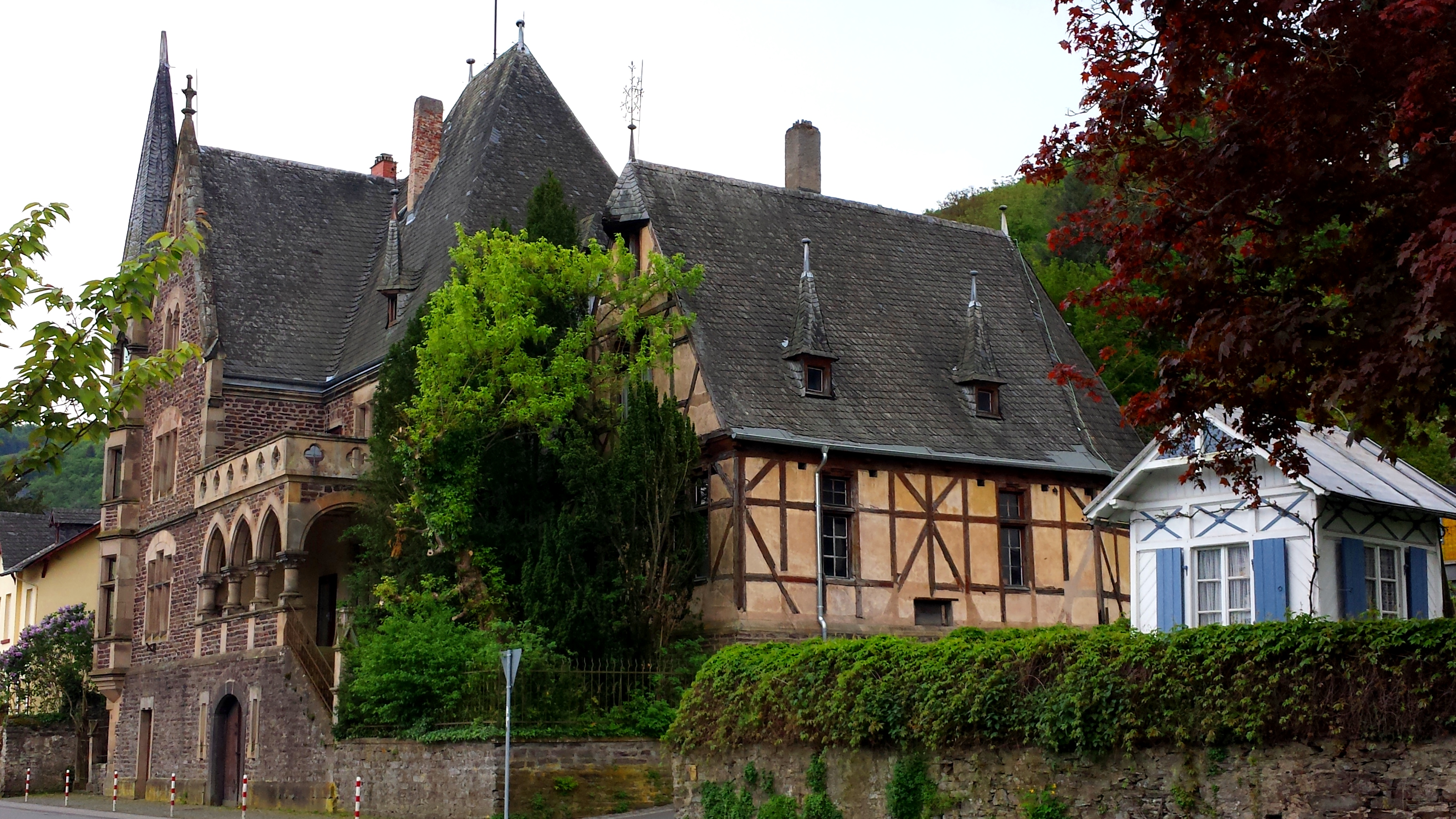
Villa in Cochem Moselpromenade 60

When his wife Betty divorced him on October 15, 1881, in Zürich-Wollishofen, Friedrichs had to pay her the 90,000 marks (as of 2016 about €639,000) for the property, which had since been sold. After Betty remarried in 1882 and had a romantic winegrower's villa built in Cochem with her second husband Johann Josef Schunck (1849-1893) in 1884/85, Friedrichs acquired a plot of land in the immediate vicinity of the villa at the end of August 1885. Although the Schunck couple sold their villa in October 1888 and moved to Bonn, Friedrichs had the tower built in 1889/90 and the top decorated by the "Mahnhand". An inscription on the front of the tower shows the following words in large letters:

COLUMBARIUM ERBAUT 1889 VON C.J.FRIEDRICHS COND.

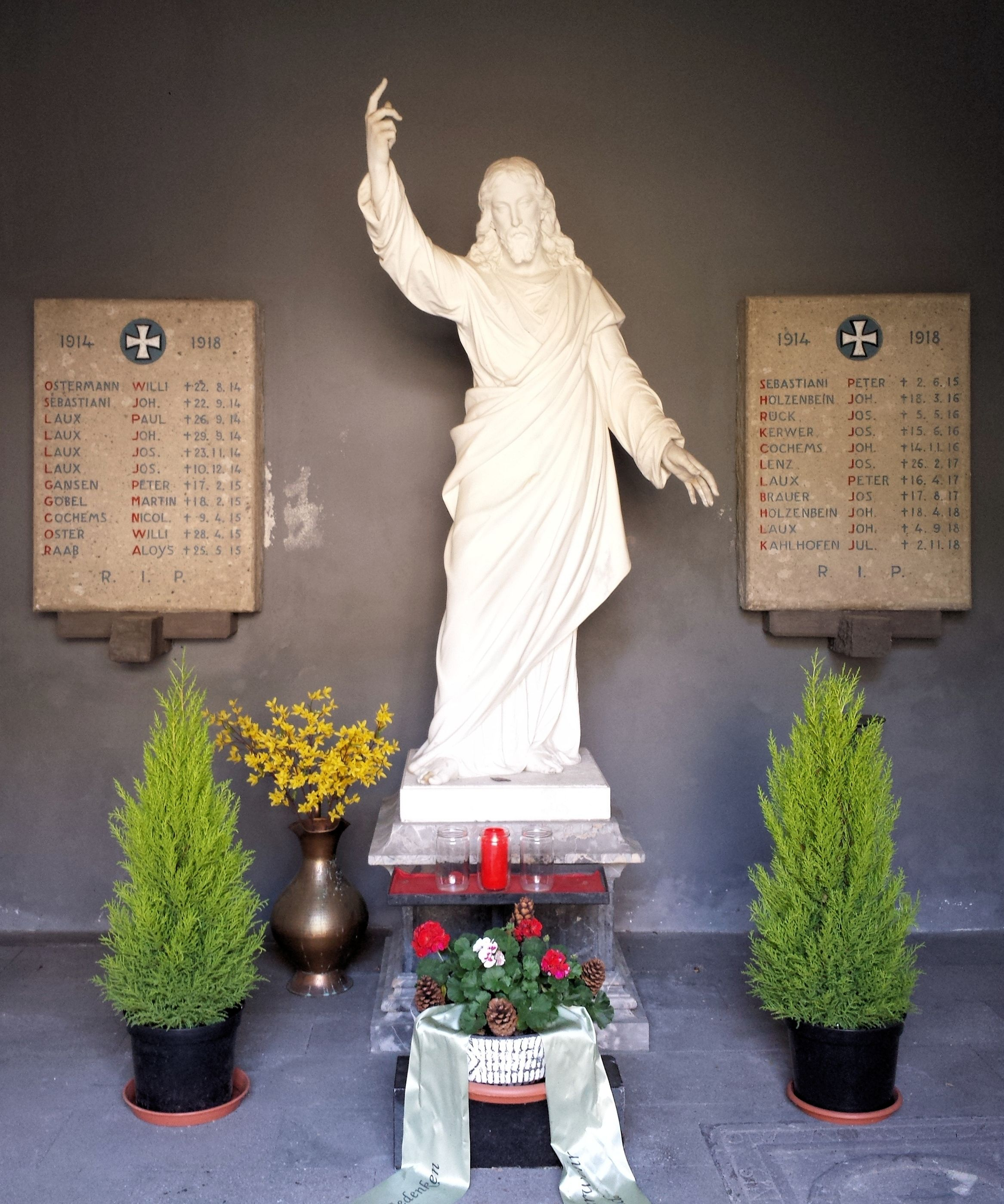
Statue of Christ out of the Columbarium, now in Cond

The Mahnhand, erroneously called the Oath-hand, is made of copper-plate, is about 1.05 m large and 0.7 m wide and weighs 13.1 kg. The fact that the hand appears golden today is due to a coating that was applied as a permanent protection against corrosion. When the tower was opened for the first time in 1928, a life-size white statue of Christ made of Carrara marble was found inside. The owner, Friedrich's eldest son, Medical Officer of Health Alphons Friedrichs (* October 10, 1868 in Meiningen) left it to the parish of Cond, which had it installed in the War Memorial Chapel in the former steeple of St. Remaclus Church. The hand was probably removed from the roof of the tower around 1932. When the property with the tower on it was sold again in the 1960s, the new owner removed the roof construction because the roof was no longer in good condition.

== Restoration ==
The restoration of the original pyramid roof with slate roofing was carried out between September and December 2019 on the initiative of the book author Stephan Tournay ("Die Mahnhand von Cochem") and the owner Günter Zenz. The necessary reconstruction of the Timber roof truss, the covering of the roof with slate and the installation of the "Mahnhand" at the top of the tower was carried out by the brothers and Master-Roofer Stefan and Christoph Marx from Cochem. The building permit for the construction project had previously been issued by the Rhineland-Palatinate Monuments Office with effect from March 22, 2019. The building costs for the entire construction project amounted to about €30,000, which came exclusively from private funds.

== Sources ==
- Neuendorf/Knevel: Die Geschichte vom Cochemer Kolumbarium. In: Cochemer Stadtbote. 1974.
- Walter Gattow: Die Schwurhand von Cochem. In: Heimatjahrbuch Cochem-Zell 1987. S. 104–106.
- Hermann Jung: Die Schwurhand von Cochem. Eine wahre Ostergeschichte von der Mosel. In: Mittag. Nr. 72/1932.
- Die Mahnhand von Cochem von Stephan Tournay (Verfasser), 1. Auflage 2018, ISBN 978-3-00-060283-2, 414 Seiten (Online)
- Alfons Friderichs (Hrsg.): Friedrichs, Carl Joseph. In: Persönlichkeiten des Kreises Cochem-Zell, Kliomedia, Trier 2004, ISBN 3-89890-084-3, S. 116.
