= Confederate Gulch and Diamond City =

Steeply incised gulch in the Big Belt Mountains

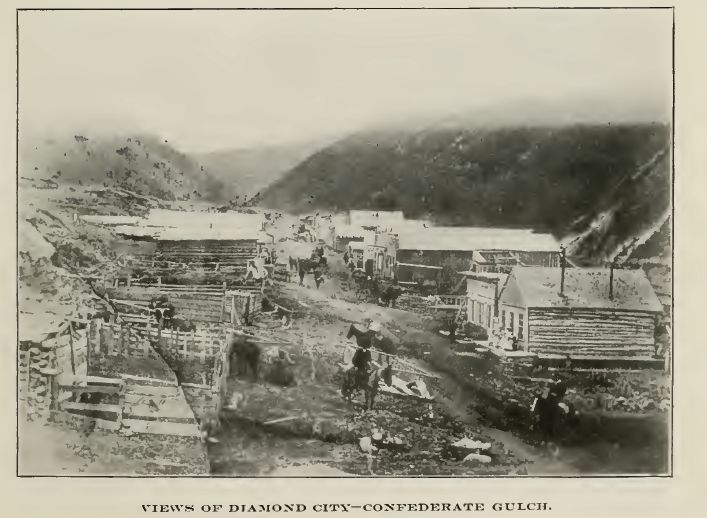
Diamond City, c. 1870

Confederate Gulch is a steeply incised gulch or valley on the west-facing slopes of the Big Belt Mountains in the U.S. state of Montana. Its small stream drains westward into Canyon Ferry Lake, on the upper Missouri River near present-day Townsend, Montana. In 1864, Confederate soldiers on parole during the American Civil War made a minor gold discovery in the gulch, but the discovery of the sensationally rich Montana Bar the following year—one of the richest placer strikes per acre ever made—led to other rich gold strikes up and down the gulch, and touched off a frantic boom period of placer gold mining in the area that extended through 1869. From 1866 to 1869, the gulch equaled or outstripped all other mining camps in the Montana Territory in gold production, producing an estimated $19–30 million worth of gold (in late 1860s dollars). For a time, Confederate Gulch was the largest community in Montana. In 1866, Montana had a total population of 28,000, and of these, about 10,000 (35%) were working in Confederate Gulch.

The main boomtown serving the miners at Confederate Gulch was Diamond City (46°35′50″N 111°25′26″W). During its heyday, Diamond City was the county seat of Montana's Meagher County, though today the area is part of Broadwater County. While gold production was at its height, Diamond City roared along both night and day. In their frantic efforts to get at more gold, the miners built ditches and flumes that extended for miles, and employed high pressure hydraulic mining methods which washed down whole hillsides and ate up the gulch floor. The hydraulic mining process left huge spoil banks in the gulch and eventually consumed the original site of Diamond City, which had to be moved to a new location.

By 1870, the gold supply at Confederate Gulch had been exhausted, the boom was over and the residents of Diamond City simply picked up and left. In 1870, there were only 255 people remaining, and a year later only about 60. Today hardly a trace remains of Diamond City or the other gulch communities. An unimproved road still winds up the gulch from the Missouri River valley and crosses the top of the Big Belts on its way down to the Smith River valley. Confederate Gulch, Diamond City and the Montana Bar remain spectacular examples of Montana's mining history, particularly the flash-in-the-pan placer gold mining camps common in Montana in the latter half of the 19th century.

== Geology ==
Confederate Gulch is considered its own unique mining district. The district includes the length of the gulch along with the upper tributaries of Boulder Creek, Montana Gulch, and Cement Gulch.

The principal rocks underlying the placer gold deposits of the Confederate Gulch district are the shales of the Spokane and Greyson formations, as well as limestones of the Newland formation. These are cut by diorite and quartz diorite dikes, stocks, and sills. Narrow quartz veins, found along fractures in the diorite and along bedding planes in the shale, contain most of the high-grade gold ore. Ore values decrease with depth, and few mines have been developed deeper than 150 feet (46 m). In addition to the quartz veins in the shales, the diorite contains "low grade mineralized shear zones".

These Spokane, Greyson and Newland formations have been uniformly considered to be in the Middle Proterozoic Belt Supergroup. In this classification, these formations would be much older than the overlying Flathead sandstone from the Middle Cambrian Period, and the division between the older Proterozoic rocks and the newer Cambrian rocks was considered to be a significant disconformity. New field work in the Big Belt Mountains suggests that some rocks mapped as the Spokane Formation are conformable with overlying Middle Cambrian strata, and are not part of the Middle Proterozoic Belt Supergroup but are part of strata that may be younger Late Neoproterozoic.

The rich placer gravels of the drainages were deposited during the interglacial stages of the Pleistocene epoch. Confirmation of concentration of the placer gold deposits in relatively recent times is indicated by the bones of mastodons and elephants that were dug out of the gravels. The distribution of the placer gold concentrations suggests that the common source of most of the placer gold in Confederate Gulch and White Creek was a series of quartz lodes on Miller Mountain on the divide between the two drainages. These gold-bearing quartz lodes were consumed by the erosion that produced the placer gold deposits in Confederate and White Gulch.

== Initial gold discovery ==
In 1864 and 1865, before the end of the American Civil War, Confederate soldiers arrived in the Montana Territory to prospect for gold. Many of the soldiers had been part of General Sterling Price's Confederate army, which had invaded Missouri from Arkansas in the fall of 1864. The campaign disintegrated after several critical defeats by Union forces. However, the remnants of the defeated army remained in quasi-official units of a couple of hundred to a thousand or so.

Pursuing these scattered units was costly, time-consuming, and dangerous business. After pondering the situation, the Union commander in the area, General Alfred Pleasonton, instituted a policy of amnesty, offering parole to the Confederates captured during the 1864 campaign if they would leave the combat area and travel up the Missouri River into the west. Pleasanton hoped that his policy for prisoners of war would also convince the remaining free-roving units to disband and prevent them from becoming partisan bushwhackers living off the land like Quantrill's Raiders and the James boys.

Fighting and perhaps dying for what many viewed as the lost cause of the Confederacy was discouraging. The offered parole seemed the better choice. Additional motivation came from rumors of rich new gold discoveries in the Montana Territory. Whether due to Pleasanton's policy or in spite of it, in 1864 and 1865 these ragtag Confederate units faded away, and a tough breed of Missourians began to show up in the Montana Territory.

In 1864, two Confederate prisoners, Wash (Washington) Barker and Pomp Dennis, were paroled and released at Liberty, Missouri to the owner of a steamboat bound up the Missouri River for the Montana goldfields. Steamboats had to make frequent refueling stops for wood to heat the boilers, but from Yankton, Dakota Territory to Fort Benton, Montana Territory (a distance of well over 1,000 river miles), hostile Indians controlled most of the country. The Indians had burned the few existing wood yards and steamboats had to stop and cut wood as they went. Rebel soldiers like Barker and Dennis could work their way to the Montana Territory by chopping fuel along the way.

The Missouri River was low in 1864, and Barker and Dennis only made it as far as Cow Island before low water forced the steamboat to unload passengers and freight. The freight and paying passengers were carted by team and wagon the rest of the way to Fort Benton, but the former Confederates were on their own. News had come down the river that a new gold strike had been made at Last Chance Gulch (present-day Helena, Montana), at the foot of Mullan Pass, but by the time Barker and Dennis walked there from Cow Island, the good ground was taken, no jobs were to be had, and the cost of living was high.

Smoke from prospectors' camps could be seen all along the foothills and so Barker and Dennis set out up the Missouri from Last Chance Gulch, prospecting here and there, living off the country. Here the Missouri was a large mountain river, cold and clear, bordered on each side by high ranges, with vast alluvial fans running out from steep gulches down to the river. Good color (Note: The "color" referred to is the heavy black mineral magnetite, which is more common than gold, and is often associated with gold, so it is used as an indicator or marker of potential gold strikes.) could be found in these gravels, but so far there were no rich strikes.

While prospecting and living off the country, Barker and Dennis were joined by Jack Thompson and John Wells, who had also been rebel soldiers. They eventually wandered into a gulch on the west side of the Big Belt Mountains. Late fall was at hand, and they determined to stay for the winter; there was a good creek and plenty of wild game. At one place near the mouth of the gulch, east of the creek, Thompson sunk a hole and found the first pay dirt, a piece of gold about the size of a grain of wheat. Prospecting up the canyon they found more gold in small quantities. Eventually they established a modest discovery of placer gold in gravels of the little creek, where a day's hard work could produce enough to pay for a few pounds of beans.

=== Naming Confederate Gulch and Diamond City ===
The initial strike of Barker, Dennis and Thompson on the gulch in the Big Belt Mountains was small, but hard work produced enough gold so that word spread. Other Southern sympathizers showed up in late 1864, and the area became known as Confederate Gulch.

During the winter of 1864–1865, four log cabins were built equidistant around a large rock obstruction on the narrow floor of the gulch. The paths from cabin to cabin made a perfect diamond in the snow as seen from the slopes above, and so the cabins in the gulch were named Diamond City. The "city" part of the name was a joke, comparing this poor settlement of Southern sympathizers to the booming mining camps of Helena and Virginia City.

== Discovery of the Montana Bar ==
Diamond City and the associated prospecting camp grew slowly. In the winter/spring of 1865, many prospectors passed through Confederate Gulch, since it was on one of the few trails that led from the Missouri Valley up over the Big Belt Mountains to the Smith River Valley, where game was abundant and there was available land that could be farmed.

In late 1865 a group of newcomers arrived, referred to as "The Germans". They were led by an old-time Colorado prospector named Carl Joseph Friedrichs (1831–1916). He liked the looks of things and prospected up the stream in an area that later became known as Cement Gulch. The Cement Gulch area later became one of the richest discoveries of Confederate Gulch, but the Germans did not get down to bedrock and so they decided to move on to look elsewhere. Friedrichs led his group back down the main gulch through timber and sank a prospect hole in a clearing on a shelf up from the gulch floor, at the foot of a small tributary. In the prospect hole, the group literally "struck it rich". The tributary became famed as Montana Gulch, and the shelf became doubly famed as the Montana Bar of the Montana Gulch.

The Montana Bar was only about 2 to 3 acres (8,100 to 12,100 m^{2}) in extent, but it was one of the truly spectacular placer gold discoveries in terms of yield per unit area. The Bar was also unique in that the gold was not located on bedrock at the bottom of the gulch, but was in a shelf of gravel located up on the side of the gulch. The Montana Bar gravels were saturated with gold from the surface down to the bedrock, which was a dense blue-gray limestone. Depressions in the bedrock trapped gold, and when washed over by water, the gold in these depressions was so thick it could be seen from a distance as glowing metal. The gold-bearing gravel deposit was about 8 feet (2.4 m) deep in most places, but thickened to 30 or 40 feet (9.1 or 12.2 m) against the mountain.

The few acres of the Montana Bar were freakishly rich in gold. It was claimed that the gravels of the Montana Bar were some of the richest ever washed, anywhere. It was not uncommon to get $1,000 of gold from a pan of gravel and dirt, and this was at a time when gold was worth less than $20 an ounce. The record pan, according to witnesses, was $1,400, or roughly seven pounds of gold in 15 pounds (two shovelfuls) of gravel. At the first clean-up of the sluice boxes on the Bar, the riffles were clogged with gold. One week's production of gold on Montana Bar netted $115,000.

A popular legend grew up around the discovery of the Montana Bar. According to the popular account, the Germans were greenhorns, and did not know the habits of gold (being heavier than dirt and loose rock) to sink to the lowest levels of bedrock in a gulch due to the forces of erosion and gravity. In response to their earnest, repeated (and annoying) requests to the more experienced Confederate boys for directions to "the good claims", they were told (with a wave of the hand at the sides of the gulch) to "go up yonder". According to legend, they dutifully went "up yonder" and discovered the Montana Bar.

== Gold production ==
The discovery of the Montana Bar immediately generated frantic prospecting throughout Confederate Gulch and its tributaries. This rapidly led to a multitude of strikes.

Rich finds were developed along Confederate Gulch proper. Two miles up Confederate Gulch, claims in Cement Gulch proved very rich and productive. Prospecting up Montana Gulch new discoveries were made. Good placer deposits were found along Greenhorn Gulch and Boulder Gulch.

The Montana Bar strike motivated prospectors to prospect the sides of Confederate Gulch mining district. Gold is heavy, and the sorting process from water and glacier flow usually results in concentrations of gold down on bedrock along the gulch bottom. Confederate Gulch was the exception. Some of the richest gold concentrations were found in benches of gravel along the hillsides.

On the same hillside level as the Montana Bar the Diamond Bar was discovered. It was as rich in yield per acre as the Montana Bar, though not as extensive. Gold Hill and other gravel shelves at the same level along the gulch and its tributaries yielded good gold production.

The Boulder Bars were in Boulder Gulch. These benches rested on shelves of bedrock. They posed a special problem. The surface of these hillside benches were littered with large boulders even though underneath were well sorted stream gravels with streaks and pockets of gold. The underlying gravels were hard to work because the surface boulders settled in heaps as the underlying lighter gravel was carted away or washed away by hydraulic methods.

Within a few months after the Montana Bar strike of 1865 Confederate Gulch and its tributaries were an anthill of activity with gold miners swarming over the ground, digging and working on their claims.

=== Gold production, 1866–1869 ===
For a few years Confederate Gulch boomed. From 1866 to 1869, Confederate Gulch probably equaled or outstripped other Montana Camps in gold production, chiefly because (a) the gold was coarse and easy to get at, (b) water was close and (c) gradients were favorable to create sluice currents and dump disposal. These conditions also allowed the transition from simpler placer operations to more efficient hydraulic mining.

The initial strike on Montana Bar set records for gold production. The best of the 200-foot-wide (61 m) claims along the shelf yielded $180,000.00, or about $900 per running foot of width. The total production from the Montana Bar alone is estimated at $1 million to $1.5 million.

Confederate Gulch proper was mined for a distance of five miles (8 km). When properly worked the Confederate Gulch claims were all rich. The rich stretches along the bottom of the Gulch were very rich. The gold production ran from $100.00 to $500.00 per running foot, and produced $20,000 to $100,000 per claim.

Cement Gulch and Montana Gulch were highly productive, but Cement Gulch was in a class by itself. They produced more gold than comparable claims of the Montana Bar, though requiring movement of a much larger tonnage of gravel, boulders and dirt.

No one knows how much gold was taken from the Boulder Bars. Because of the boulders strewn across the surface of the bars, they were worked by many different operators, some mere pocket hunters and others operating with teams of men and equipment.

The gold production of Confederate Gulch created massive gold shipments from the gulch, starting with the spectacular production of Montana Bar. A single shipment of gold in 1866, representing a short run of gold bearing gravel through the sluice boxes weighed two tons and was valued at $900,000.00. In the late 1860s two and a half tons of gold were produced in a final clean up of the sluice boxes.

In September 1866 the steamboat Luella piloted by Captain Grant Marsh took 230 miners back down the Missouri River to the states. Between the gold carried by individual miners and consigned gold shipments, the Luella had a cumulative two and a half tons of gold on board, conservatively valued at $1,250,000. This was the richest cargo ever carried down the Missouri River by steamboat. The bulk of this gold reputedly represented production in 1866 from the Confederate Gulch area.

There are varying estimates of the total gold production from the Confederate Gulch Mining District during the boom years—1866 to 1869. The estimates run from $16 million to an estimate of $10 to $30 million. These estimates could fall far short of the total gold volume that was actually produced. The total production will never be known. Businesses which transported gold, as well as individual miners took out their gold secretly, in order to mislead highwaymen and prevent robbery.

All of the estimates of gold production are in 1860s dollars. In addition, this is when gold was worth less than $20 an ounce. Were the values of total production be stated in today's dollars, the figures would be much higher than the estimates.

A feature of Confederate Gulch is the abrupt jump into high production of gold in 1866, the continued intensity of the production through 1867 and 1868, and its abrupt end in 1869/70. Gold production from the Confederate Gulch mining district started at a high level in 1866 because of the sheer opulence of the Montana Bar strike. Production was maintained at a high level as numerous fresh strikes were made and brought on line. The intense utilization of hydraulic mining kept the production levels high from 1866 onward until the gold ran out in 1869/70.

==== Technical problems ====
Along Confederate Gulch and on Cement Gulch the gold claims were rich, but they demanded a great deal of labor. There were large boulders mixed with gravel along the gulch bottoms. These boulders had to be moved. Cold water would flood the shafts and trenches. The hillside shelves, like Montana Bar and Diamond Bar were easier to mine, but even some of the hillside shelves had technical problems. Along the various Boulder Bars, the large boulders that littered the surface had to be drilled and blasted, or lifted and moved by rope tackle. These were dangerous projects.

==== Hydraulic mining ====
Confederate Gulch saw large scale hydraulic mining. Hydraulic mining methods in Confederate Gulch used the force of water to wash down banks of gravel bars and terraces located on the sides of the gulches, as well as the beds of gravel on the gulch floor. The earth and fine gravel was then flushed through sluice boxes where the heavier gold was extracted from the lighter gravel.

Hydraulic mining was particularly applicable in Confederate Gulch because gold bearing gravels lay on terraces high up on the hillsides above the gulch. In addition, the water sources and gradients supported the development of hydraulic mining.

Water from sources high up the gulch were tapped and fed into flumes or ditches that ran along the sides of the gulch. The ditch/flume was kept at a much shallower gradient than the floor of the gulch. Eventually the water in the flumes and ditches was high above the mining sites down on the floor of the gulch. The water was then released from the high ditch down through several hundred feet of pipe, and emerged through huge nozzles that resembled small cannon. The massive jets of water from these nozzles reputedly had such force that they could smash down a brick building in one pass. The most powerful hydraulic hoses required six men to control.

Building the ditches and flumes that hydraulic methods required large amounts of capital. This brought outside investors into the business of removing gold from the gulch. They wanted the quickest return possible on their investment and they encouraged unrestricted use of hydraulic methods.

The powerful jets of water used in hydraulic mining washed down whole hillsides and simply ate up the floor of the gulch. The dirt and fine gravel was then washed through the sluices, and the silt was carried off down the gulch. The gravel tailings produced by hydraulic mining were left behind as spoil banks, piled along the bottom of the gulch for long intervals. Hydraulic mining methods and the resulting spoil banks obliterated all the remains of the original Diamond City, as well as the other small communities in the gulches. Hydraulic mining was very damaging to the environment on the gulch. It changed the appearance, geography and ecosystem of Confederate Gulch.

=== Later mining operations ===
From 1866 to 1869 the miners swarmed over the Confederate Gulch area and skimmed the cream as well as took the milk. They got it all, or most of it. Nothing after that—neither the placer mining operations or the lode mining operations—even came close to the production in the boom years.

After 1870 some sporadic hydraulic operations continued in Confederate Gulch and its tributaries for many years. A company based in Milwaukee worked some old ground briefly in 1899. About nine years later, a company worked gravels in the lower end of the gulch using a Risdon dredge, but it shut down operations after three months when it found no values in the gravels. Placering continued off and on during the late 1910s and 1920s, with at least two operations in 1928; lack of water frequently hampered success.

Gold activity often works inversely to economic health. In the booming 1920s mining activity fell off. As a worldwide depression developed after 1928, gold production increased. The federal government moved to establish the price of gold, which rose to about $35.00 per ounce. The increased price of gold, combined with lower wages and material costs prevailing during the Depression, caused gold mining to become attractive again.

Dredging companies moved into Confederate Gulch in a big way in the 1930s, using power shovels and a variety of other equipment, including a stationary washing plant, dry-land dredge, and drag-line dredge. The best returns came in 1939 when two dredging operations recovered 2,357 fine ounces of gold. One company had 16 to 18 men on the payroll that season. A single dry-land dredge worked the ground in 1942, after which operations shut down for the duration of World War II.

The reported 1939 year's production of 2,357 ounces of gold was worth $82,495.00 at the then current price of $35.00 per ounce. This is but a small patch on the boom days of 1866 to 1869, when tons of gold were produced yearly from Confederate Gulch, and one week on the legendary Montana Bar produced $115,000.00 of gold at under $20.00 per ounce.

=== Lode mining ===
Even before the placer deposits began to run out, miners were combing the Big Belts for the "mother lode"—that is, the rich emplacement of gold in bedrock which had, through erosion, produced all the placer gold found in the Confederate Gulch gravels. No rich "mother lode" was ever found. The general theory is that the mother lode was consumed by erosion and the gold was distributed into the gravels that lay along the sides and bottom of Confederate Gulch and adjacent gulches in the Big Belt Mountains.

Though no mother lode was found, there were some lode operations in the Confederate Gulch district but they never measured up to the standard set by the rich placer mines. The most important mines, including the Hummingbird, Slim Jim, Schabert, Baker Group, and Three Sisters, are all located along the divide between Confederate Gulch and White Creek, principally on Miller Mountain. Lode mines produced only $100,000 in gold, while the placers of Confederate Gulch yielded this sum one hundred and fifty times over. The Philadelphia Mill, with a capacity of 15 tons per day, operated briefly at Diamond City around 1889.

== Diamond City: "The Most Spectacular of Montana's Boom and Bust Gold Towns" ==
Confederate Gulch and Diamond City were transformed by the discovery of the Montana Bar, followed closely by the discovery of the Diamond Bar. Gold was being generated and shipped in record volumes. Word flashed across the territory and miners poured into the diggings.

From a small collection of cabins and shacks Diamond City was instantly transformed into a crowded boom town that roared along both night and day. Satellite communities sprouted up on the Gulch—El Dorado, Boulder, Jim Town, and Cement Gulch City. At the crest of the boom ten thousand people lived and worked in Confederate Gulch, but Diamond City dominated the area, and when Meagher County was formed Diamond City was named the county seat.

Between 1866 and 1869, when Diamond City and Confederate Gulch had ten thousand people grubbing for gold, federal estimates put Montana's total population at twenty eight thousand. In these years, roughly 35% of Montana's population was working in Confederate Gulch.

Placer gold discoveries, like Confederate Gulch, attracted a diverse and cosmopolitan population. While many came from the Midwest and border states like Missouri, many also came from mining areas in California, Idaho and Nevada. Because they moved about so constantly, they cared little about background or status. The use of casual nicknames predominated over proper names. A roster of Confederate Gulch citizens could include names like Wild Goose Bill, Black Jack, Nubbins, Roachy, Steady Tom, Workhorse George, Dirty Mary, Whiskey Mike, and Lonesome Larry.

Placer gold strikes were "poor man's diggings". Placer gold is formed by erosion forces which slowly break down gold veins embedded in bed rock and over geologic time leave the gold in the gravels and sands of ancient or presently flowing river beds. The gold is in a natural state in the form of gold dust, flakes or nuggets. Such deposits required no special processing, except the hard grueling work to dig out and sort through tons of gravel, dirt, sand and boulders. Newly discovered deposits like Confederate Gulch attracted young footloose men, motivated by a desire to get rich quickly.

Towns that sprang up at placer gold strikes were jerry built, ephemeral and hectic places and Diamond City and the other Confederate Gulch communities were no exception. As long as gold was produced they boomed along. When the mining stopped, the prospectors left as suddenly as they came.

During the boom years, Diamond City seethed with excitement and activity. It provided entertainment and commercial goods for the miners and for the crews that labored night and day to build a 7-mile-long (11 km) ditch/flume for hydraulic work. When the ditch/flume was completed, full scale hydraulic mining began. At the height of the mining activity, between 1866 and 1869, hydraulic mining led to the displacement of Diamond City. The approaching hydraulic mining undercut the town, and spoil banks began to pile up against buildings. The merchants first propped their buildings on stilts. Eventually the stilts reached fifteen feet, and finally the town was simply removed to a nearby location in Confederate Gulch where it roared on with business as usual. Meanwhile, the hydraulic mining process ate its way through the former town site.

Mining production from 1866 through 1869 was intense—the rich deposits encouraged quick exploitation, and the shift to hydraulic mining kept production in high gear. This led to record production, but it also shortened the life expectancy of the community. In 1869 and 1870 the gold ran out and so did the population. They simply picked up and left. By 1870 the population of Diamond city was down to 225 people, and a year later only about 64 people remained; by the 1880s 4 families were left.

From nothing in 1864, and from a few cabins in 1865, Diamond City became the county seat of Meagher County and the center of most populous camp in Montana in 1866. Diamond City boomed along for 3 years until 1869. Then the party was over, almost everyone left and Diamond City sank not just into obscurity but into oblivion. Unlike other boom-bust areas, Diamond City did not even remain as a picturesque ghost town. The rapacious search for gold consumed Diamond City, and hardly a trace now remains. Reflecting this meteoric rise and fall, Diamond City has been aptly described as "the most spectacular of Montana's boom and bust gold towns" by the authoritative text, "Montana: A History of Two Centuries", by Michael P. Malone, Richard B. Roeder, William L. Lang, 1991, University of Washington Press, p. 67.

== Confederate Gulch today ==
Today, one can drive to and through Confederate Gulch on a passable but unimproved road. Confederate Gulch is unlike other boom and bust mining districts in Montana, because no ghost town was left at the site. The hydraulic mining during the boom years, and the reworking of the site since, has obliterated the sites of the earlier mining communities. Along the bottom of the gulch are spoil banks overgrown with brush. Occasional pieces of timber appear in these areas to show that once there were towns and buildings in the gulch.

One thing alone remains. On a cliff overlooking the Confederate Gulch and Boulder Gulch from the south is the graveyard for Diamond City and Confederate Gulch. About 65 people are reportedly buried there. This site is marked on Wikimapia.

== See also ==
- Alder Gulch
- Big Belt Mountains
- Sterling Price
- Alfred Pleasonton
- Thomas Francis Meagher
- Fort Benton, Montana
- Helena, Montana
- Virginia City, Montana
- Gold Prospectors Association of America
