= Carl Joseph Friedrichs =

German printer (1831–1916)

- Born: Carl Joseph Friedrichs; 16 June 1831; Cochem, Germany
- Died: 14 December 1916 (aged 85); Zürich, Switzerland
- Other name: Charles Joseph Friedrichs
- Occupations: Printer, prospector and author
- Spouse(s): Betty Hirsch (m. 1867–1881) Philippina Battlehner (m. 1882–1916)
- Children: Alphons; Margot; Theodor; Elsa; Anna; Francis; Eric
- Parent(s): Peter Friedrichs; Maria Margaretha Schubert

Carl Joseph Friedrichs (16 June 1831, Cochem – 14 December 1916, Zürich) (also published as Charles Friedrichs) was a German printer, author and gold prospector referred to as the leader of "The Germans" who found in 1865 the famed Montana Bar during the Montana Gold Rush.

== Background ==
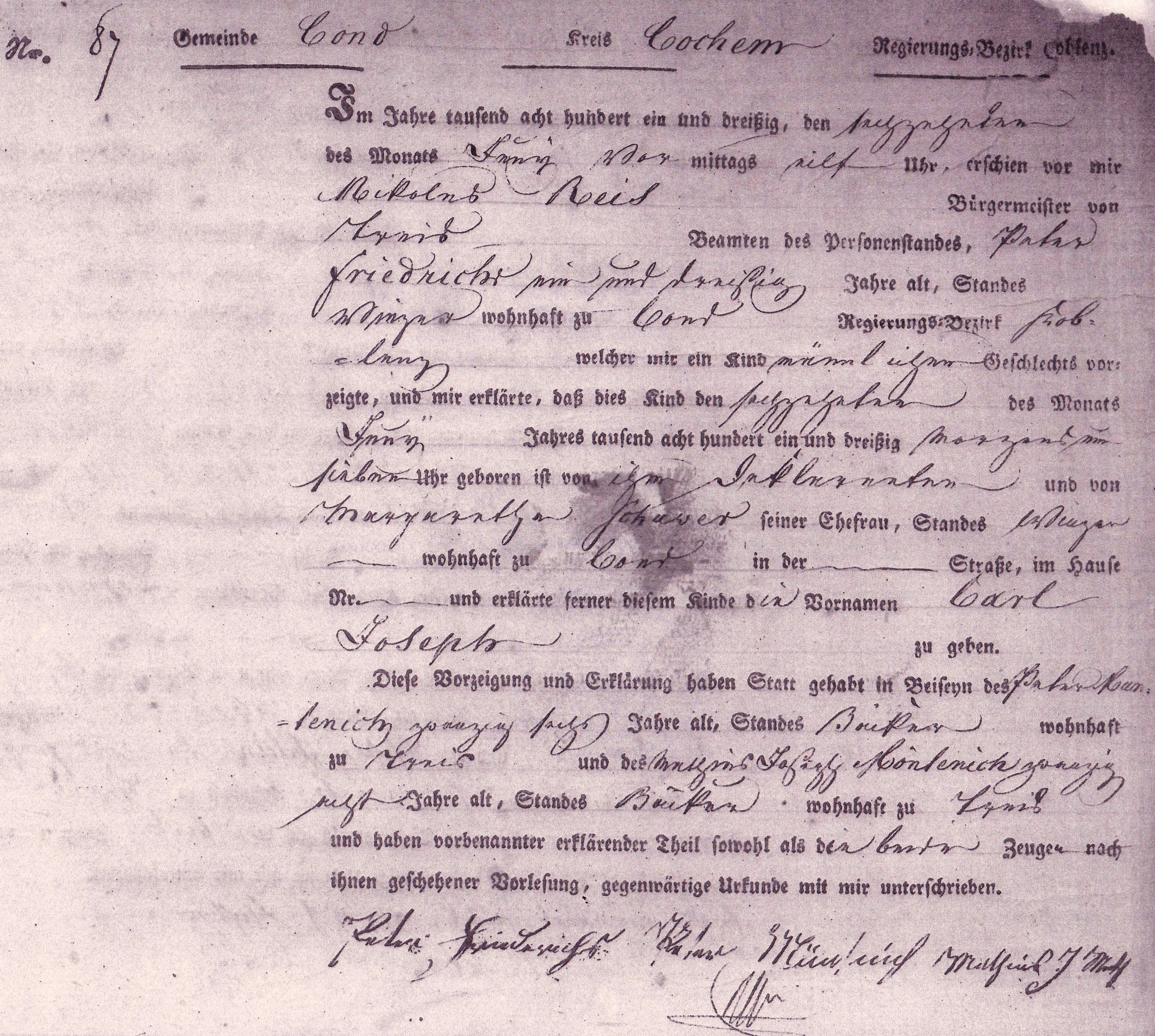
Birthcertificate of Carl Joseph Friedrichs

Carl Joseph was born in the town and head of the district seat Cochem in Germany as a son of the Tithe-Collector Peter Friedrichs (1799–1849) and his wife Maria Margaretha born Schubert (1799–1844). On 31 March 1844 his mother died after a Doctor had carried out a Bloodletting procedure for medical purposes. After his father came home from working on the fields getting the bad news he suffered an Apopletic fit and was then half-page paralyzed. Friedrichs was given to custody in the household of his grand-aunt there he finished his schooltime and started an apprenticeship as a Printer. In 1848, during the hightime of German revolutions of 1848–49, Friedrichs decided to change the educational printery and moved to Wittlich to continue his apprenticeship. His father died in 1849; after arguing with his apprentice's employer in 1850, he left Germany with the intent to emigrate to the United States.

== Career ==
Upon his arrival in Castle Garden in Manhattan in New York City, he immediately started his first job as a printer at the New York Post. Then he worked in Buffalo, in Cincinnati for the Republican, in Indianapolis for the Indiana Volksblatt and for Henry Boernsteins Anzeiger des Westens in St. Louis. Having enough money saved over the years, he decided to travel with friends by horses through the U.S. states Kansas, Arizona, Utah, New Mexico and Colorado. In May 1861, inspired by the California Gold Rush, Friedrichs and his friends started in Colorado Mining for gold following several months a Motherlode, but at the end the gold quartz was not substantial enough to be exploited.

In August 1864, after rumors had been spread around from Emigrants coming from the Canadian border through the Lake Superior reporting about significant gold findings up in the north, Friedrichs moved from Denver through Wyoming to Bannack. On the way he met again his three friends Alexander Campbell, Thaddeus Judson and John Schönemann and they continued to move on together towards Virginia City. In March 1865 the group left Virginia City to ride to Helena then they crossed the Missouri and lately they arrived at the Confederate Gulch in Diamond City. What happened next is well explained in Dan Cushmans book, "Montana – The Gold Frontier" published in 1973.

"A group called "The Germans", led by an old-time Colorado miner named Charles Fredericks (wrong spelling), liked the look of things and did some prospecting up the stream, on a main tributary which was called Cement Gulch. Cement Gulch was one of the richest in the region, but The Germans never got to the bedrock. They came back around the mountain, through thick timber, and sank in a small clearing which seemed to be a shelf at the foot of another tributary. The tributary became famed as Montana Gulch and the level shelf, only a few acres in extent, as Montana Bar"

When Friedrichs started to work out his claim during spring time in 1866 in Diamond City, he employed 40 laborers in three shifts around the clock. 34 of them received $6 per hour and the other six between $8 and $10 per hour. But the most difficulties he observed when they started to excavate the Gold was, as he wrote it on 22 May 1866 to his friend and owner of the Merchants National Bank of Helena, Louis Henry Hershfield (1836–1910), that there was over three feet of frost in the ground. During the following summer Friedrichs send Hershfield every time accompanying letters given in hands of his messenger bringing the packages with Gold dust to the Merchants National Bank.

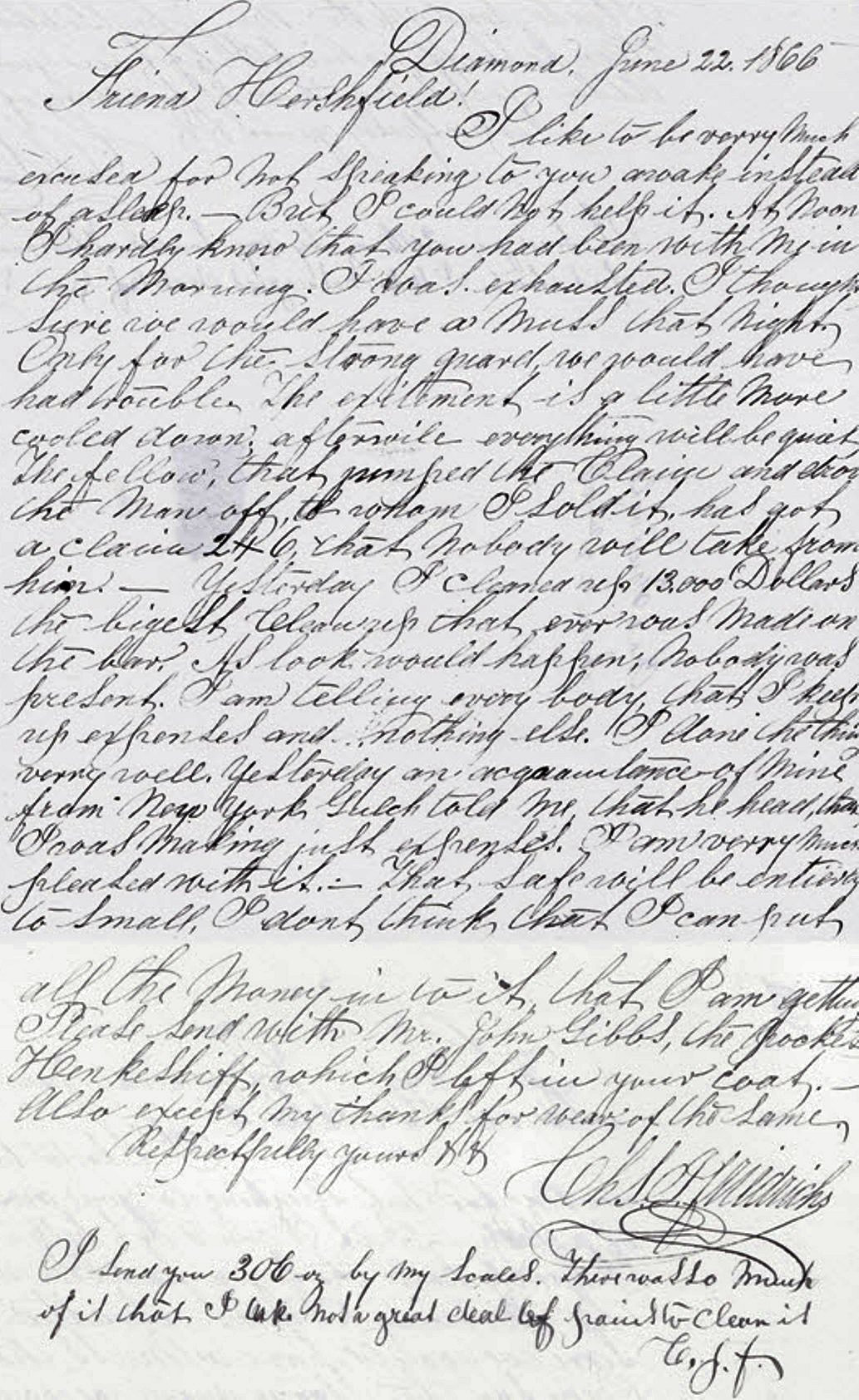
Letter of Charles Joseph Friedrichs Diamond, 22 June 1866

Diamond – 22 June 1866 Charles Friedrichs:

"Friend Hershfield! I like to be very much excused for not speaking to you awake instead of asleep.– But I could not help it. At noon I hardly knew that you had been with me in the morning. I was exhausted. I thought sure we would have a mess that night. Only for the strong guard we would have had trouble. The excitement is a little more cooled down; after while everything will be quiet. The fellow, that jumped the claim and drove the man off, to whom I sold it, has got a claim 2 x 6 that nobody will take from him. – Yesterday I cleaned up 13.000 Dollars the biggest cleanup that ever was made on the bar. As luck would happen, nobody was present. I am telling everybody, that I keep up expenses and nothing else. I had done the thing very well. Yesterday an acquaintance of mine from New York Gulch told me, that he heard, that I was making just expenses. I am very much pleased with it. – That Safe will be entirely to small, I don't think that I can put all the money in to it that I am getting. Please send with Mr. John Gibbs, the pocket handkerchief, which I left in your coat. Also accept my thanks for wear of the same." "I send you 306 oz by my scales. There was so much of it that I take not a great deal of grains to clean it. C.J.F."

In his next letter dated 8 July 1866 Friedrichs expressed his fear about possible violences coming from the social composition in Diamond City as he said: "I intended to come over tomorrow, but it is impossible. The present State of affairs does not allow me to come. I have to watch continually my own. There are about 200 Road Agents here!"

Since Friedrichs fear about these Road Agents increased more and more and his reduced physical condition brought him more problems, he decided to leave Diamond City.

"I send you by Mr. Cays two packages, contents not known. I may not be over before Monday. I think I will sell the safe here. Two Paulies wish to get it. If I do not sell it, I have to stay until Monday. I cannot get a team before that time. I have got about $40.000 more here besides what Mr. Cays brings you. I want to get away here, there are to many road agents around."

In the morning of 18 August 1866 two freight wagons each carrying half a ton Gold dust escorted by 15 men were brought to and deposited at Hershfield & Co.'s bank on Bridge street in Helena. The following week a new wagon team drawn by four mules now being escorted and guarded by the U.S. Marshal and member of the Montana Vigilantes John X. Beidler (1831–1890) drew two and half tons of Gold from Helena to Fort Benton. Most of the Gold belonged to C. F. Friedrichs, John Shineman (Schönemann), Alexander Campbell and Thaddeus Judson.

Kelly F. Flynn:

"Although Charles Friedrichs worked in Diamond City for a very short period of time, his extraordinary find on Montana Bar propelled him into ranks of Millionaires."

Friedrichs account book in Hershfield's bank enumerates many deliveries of gold dust during the summer of 1866, not counting six packages from 18, 19 and 20 July plus any other gold mined in August 1866, and any other deposits that were not showing. The evidence pointed out, that Charles Friedrichs had in total accumulated 11,200 Ounces of gold dust translated to around $15.9,000,000 in value in 2019.

Friedrichs mentioned in a letter dated 26 August 1866 to Hershfield, that they arrived safe and sound in Fort Benton, haven't seen any road agents and that they tomorrow want to leave there in Mackinaw boats down the Missouri towards Cow Island (where the steamship Luella with Captain Grant Marsh (1834–1916) was waiting for them).

Charles Friedrichs "The first day we made ten miles. We ran onto sandbanks several times and then had to jump overboard to get the ship going again. In the evening, the terrain was carefully probed, if no traces of Indians could be seen. On the fourth day (in Sept. 1866) we reached the steamer. We lay down next to it and negotiated with the Captain Grant Marsh how he would take our luggage. I agreed with him and paid four hundred and fifty dollars for myself and my luggage – including the food. Some paid more, others less. About fifty men would rather earn the money themselves by going with the wooden ships to Omaha to use the train from there. We were about one hundred sixty men in all – without the crew on the steamer. It was a very valuable vehicle with cargo and its passengers; it had about three million dollars of gold dust worth twelve and three quarters of a million marks on board. The drive to Omaha should be very boring for us. We sometimes ran onto a sandbank, so we needed the whole day to get back afloat. By the time we got to Fort Union on the Missouri, it took fourteen days alone. From then on, the fairway was better."

After 32 days Friedrichs journey with the steamship ended in Leavenworth in Kansas and they handed over their gold dust to the American Express Company. Friedrichs moved than from Leavenworth to St. Louis by train, while the gold was safely escorted and delivered to the United States Essay Office in New York City. His gold coined in average $16.85, Campells $16.79 and McGregors, another prospector who had his gold all sifted and well cleaned $17.05 per ounce. Upon his arrival in New York Friedrichs received his certificate from the assay office and bought for all the amount United States 6% Bonds in the bank of Isett, Kerr & Co. in No. 4 Wall Street. Friedrichs took than the next ship to Europe where he visited his brother Johann Friedrichs (1833–1895) in Verviers in Belgium. After he had been warned about difficulties with his bank Isett, Kerr & Co., Friedrichs made in July 1867 a quick trip back to New York to get his bonds back. The banker was surprised about his visit, but Mr. Kerr gave him 20 minutes later – after Friedrichs experienced an alp and started sweating – not his already otherwise used, but other new bonds. In 1869 when this bank had been closed to due bankruptcy, The New York Times titled:

The New York Times "Another Ponderous Wall-street Litigation. In the case of James E. Lyon vs. Thomas M. Isett, John Kerr and Watson B. Farr, in which the defendants are charged with the "wrongfull conversion of certain bonds and stocks," Judge McCunn yesterday granted orders of arrest against the defendants, fixing the amount of bail at $200,000."

The extent of richness of the Montana Bar was obviously such tremendous that still in 1904 "The Sumpter Miner" reprinted this story under the title: "RICHEST ACRE OF GROUND ON EARTH — Montana Bar Yielded Over $1,000,000 in Gold, Going $1,000 to The Pan."

== Family ==
Carl Joseph Friedrichs was married two times. First he married on 26 September 1867 Betty Hirsch (1850–1927) the youngest daughter of a rich Jewish family from Cochem. They had together four common kids. Alphons was born 10 October 1868 in Meiningen and became later a doctor and a government medical officer of health. Theodor was born 2 April 1870 in Meiningen moved later to London and was trained as a sculptor. Margot the first daughter was born 15 June 1871 also in Meiningen. The second daughter Elsa was born 4 March 1874 in Wollishofen (Zürich) but she died shortly after her 5th birthday on 23 March 1879, after suffering from pneumonia. One great-great-grandson of Alponse Friedrichs is the German artistic director of the International Jazzfestival Münster Fritz Schmücker (* 1961).

On 6 June 1882 Friedrichs married a second time Philippina Battlehner (* 12 July 1850) from Karlsruhe. They had three kids together, Anna (* 1883), Francis (* 1885) and Eric (* 1888).

In 1889 Carl Joseph Friedrichs commissioned the construction of the Columbarium in Cochem.

== Sources ==
- Dan Cushman (Author): Montana, The Gold Frontier (1973), Stay Away, Joe Publishers, Great Falls, Montana 59403, ISBN 0-911436-03-0
- Kelly F. Flynn: Goldpans, Guns & Grit, Diamond City from Territorial Gold to Montana Ghost Town Hidden Hollow Hideaway Cattle & Guest Ranch 2006, ISBN 978-1-4243-0285-7
- Carl Joseph Friedrichs (Author): "Aufzeichnungen aus meinem Leben", 1886 Frankfurt/Main
- Stephan Tournay (Author): Die Mahnhand von Cochem, 1 st Edition, 2018, ISBN 978-3-00-060283-2, 414 Pages (Online)
