= Carl C. Friedrichs =

American politician

Carl C. Friedrichs was a lawyer, politician, and officer in the Spanish American War who lived in New Orleans. He served four terms in the state legislature. He married and had ten children. He was the son of George J. Friedrichs, a dentist who was hit and killed by a trolley in New Orleans.
