= Kearney (surname) =

- Pronunciation: /kærniˌkʌrniˌkɑːrni/
- Language: English

Origin
- Origin: Irish, from Ó Catharnaigh
- Meaning: 'Descendant Of A Warrior' Or 'Warlike'

Other names
- Variant forms: Carney, Kearneys, Kearns, Kerney, O'Kearney, McKearney

Kearney is a surname of Irish origin.

== Origin ==
Kearney is an anglicized version of the Irish Gaelic surname Ó Catharnaigh, meaning descendant of Catharnach, which translates roughly to 'Warrior' or 'Warlike'.

The surname has many different unrelated origins most notably County Tipperary and County Meath with some smaller families native to the province of Connacht

== Prevalence ==
The surname is approximately the 110th most common in the Republic Of Ireland, the 183rd most common in Northern Ireland and the 1,600th most common in the United States of America.

== People with the surname ==
- Aaron Kearney (born 1971), Australian broadcaster, journalist and sports commentator.
- Aidan Kearney (disambiguation), several people
- Andrew Thomas Kearney (1892–1962), founder of management consulting firm A. T. Kearney
- Anne Kearney, American chef and restaurateur
- Bernard W. Kearney (1889–1976), Republican member of the United States House of Representatives from New York
- Bob Kearney (born 1956), former American professional baseball player
- Brett Kearney (born 1983), Australian professional rugby league footballer
- Bryan Kearney, Irish DJ/producer
- Charles E. Kearney (1820–1898), American railroad businessman
- Clayton Kearney (born 1964), former Australian sprinter and professional fitness coach
- Colm Kearney (?–2018), Irish economist
- Conor Kearney, Irish footballer and hurler
- David Kearney (disambiguation), multiple people
- Denis Kearney (1847–1907), California anti-Chinese labor leader, 1870s
- Dennis J. Kearney (born 1949), American attorney and politician in Massachusetts
- Douglas Kearney, American poet
- Dyre Kearney (died 1791), American lawyer and delegate for Delaware to the Continental Congress
- Elfric Wells Chalmers Kearney (1881–1966), Australian inventor, engineer and author
- Emma Kearney (actress) (born 1981), Irish television and theatre actress
- Emma Kearney (sportswoman) (born 1989), Australian cricket and football player
- Eric Kearney (born 1963), American politician in the state of Ohio
- Fred Kearney (1897–1998), Canadian ice hockey player
- Garnet Kearney (1884–1971), Canadian doctor
- Ged Kearney (born 1963), Australian politician
- Gillian Kearney (born 1972), British actress
- Gus Kearney (1870–1907), Australian rules footballer
- Hagen Kearney (born 1991), American snowboarder
- Hannah Kearney (born 1986), American mogul skier
- Hugh Kearney (1924–2017), British-born historian
- James Kearney (disambiguation), multiple people
- Janis F. Kearney, American author, lecturer, and publisher
- Jim Kearney (rugby union) (1920–1998), New Zealand international rugby player
- Jim Kearney (American football) (born 1943), American football player
- Jim Kearney (Australian footballer) (1894–1944), player for Geelong and Richmond between 1915 and 1921
- John Kearney (disambiguation), multiple people
- Jonathan Kearney (born 1971), English artist
- Joseph Kearney (1927–2010), American university athletics administrator
- Liam Kearney (born 1983), Irish professional footballer
- Mark Kearney (footballer) (born 1962), English footballer
- Mark A. Kearney (born 1962), American federal judge
- Martha Kearney (born 1957), Irish-born British broadcaster and journalist
- Mat Kearney (born 1978), American singer-songwriter
- Michael Kearney (disambiguation), multiple people
- Miriam Kearney (born 1959), former Irish politician
- Molly Kearney, American actor and comedian
- Patrick Kearney (disambiguation), multiple people
- Paul Kearney (born 1967), Northern Irish fantasy author
- Peadar Kearney (1883–1942), author of the Irish national anthem
- Raymond Augustine Kearney (1902–1956), American prelate of the Roman Catholic Church
- Richard Kearney (born 1954), Irish philosopher
- Rob Kearney (born 1986), Irish rugby union footballer
- Stephen Kearney (born 1972), New Zealand rugby league footballer and coach
- Stephen W. Kearney (1794–1848), U.S. military officer
- Teresa Kearney (1875–1957), Irish religious
- Thomas Henry Kearney (1874–1956), American botanist
- Tim Kearney (American football), American football player
- Tim Kearney (politician), American politician from Pennsylvania
- Tom Kearney (disambiguation), multiple people
- Tony Kearney, Scottish actor and TV presenter
- Tully Kearney (born 1997), English swimmer
- Victor Kearney (1903–1982), Australian politician
- Vincent Kearney (born 1965), Irish journalist

== See also ==
- Kerney, a surname
