= Indonesia AirAsia Flight 8501 =

2014 aviation accident in the Java Sea

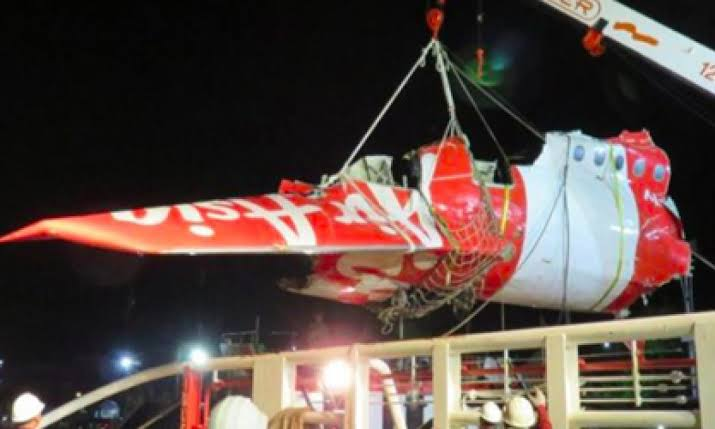
- The tail section of the aircraft being recovered

Accident
- Date: 28 December 2014
- Summary: Crashed into the sea following mishandled non-critical failure leading to stall and failure of the Airbus A320 stall protection.
- Site: Karimata Strait, Java Sea near Indonesia; 3.623°S 109.712°E (Note: Location where the aircraft's flight data recorder was found on the sea floor.)

Aircraft
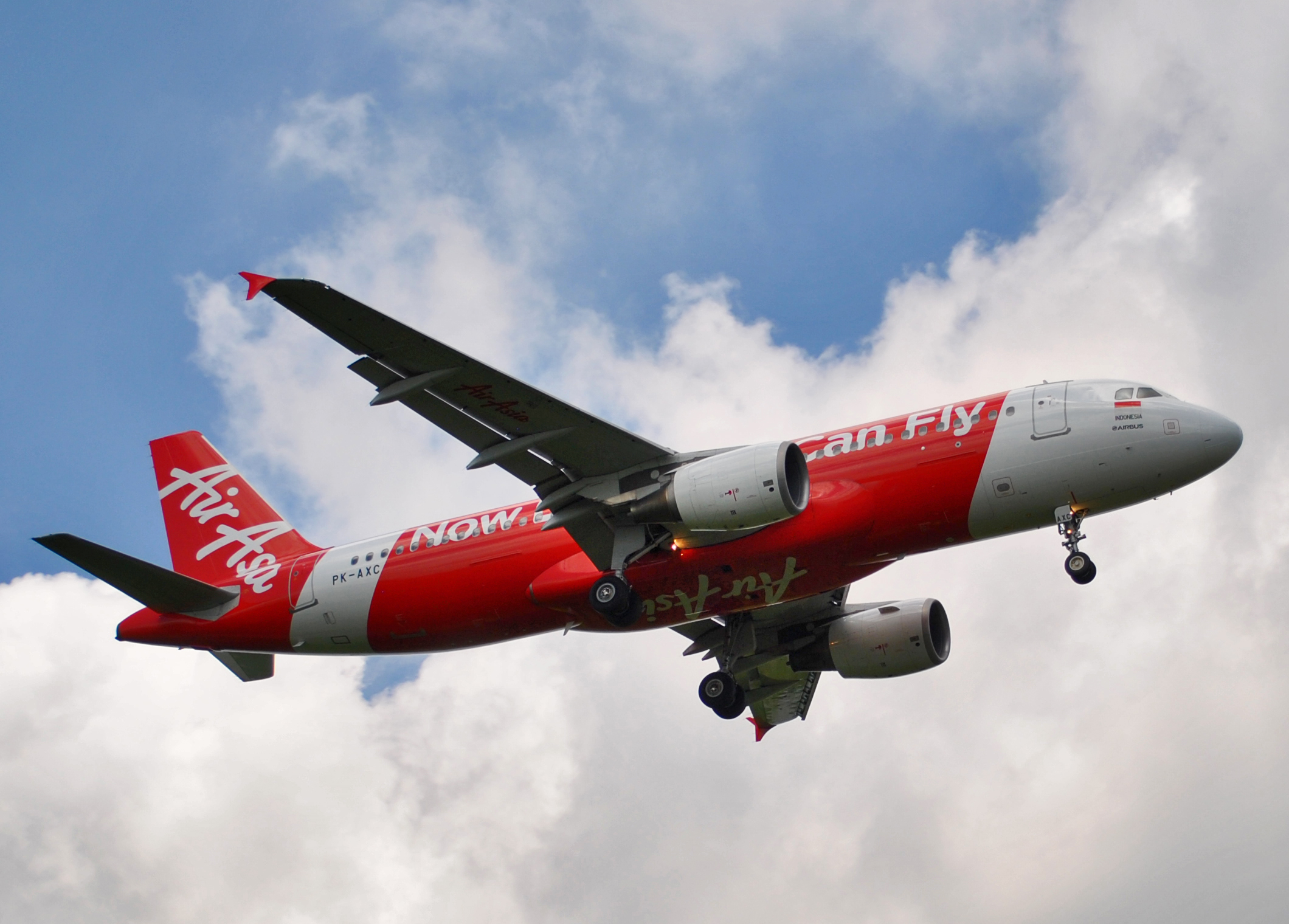
- PK-AXC, the aircraft involved in the accident, photographed in April 2014
- Aircraft type: Airbus A320-216
- Operator: Indonesia AirAsia
- IATA flight No.: QZ8501
- ICAO flight No.: AWQ8501
- Call sign: WAGON AIR 8501
- Registration: PK-AXC
- Flight origin: Juanda International Airport, Surabaya, Indonesia
- Destination: Changi Airport, Changi, Singapore
- Occupants: 162
- Passengers: 155
- Crew: 7
- Fatalities: 162
- Survivors: 0

Indonesia AirAsia Flight 8501 was a scheduled international passenger flight operated by Indonesia AirAsia from Surabaya, Indonesia, to Singapore. On 28 December 2014, the Airbus A320 flying the route crashed into the Java Sea, killing all 162 of the people on board. When search operations ended in March 2015, only 116 bodies had been recovered. As of 2026, this is the only fatal accident involving AirAsia and its affiliates.

In December 2015, the Indonesian National Transportation Safety Committee (KNKT or NTSC) released a report concluding that a non-critical malfunction in the rudder control system prompted the captain to perform a non-standard reset of the on-board flight control computers. Control of the aircraft was subsequently lost, resulting in a stall and uncontrolled descent into the sea. Miscommunication between the two pilots was cited as a contributing factor.

== Accident ==
Flight path and location of debris. Flight path (red) is limited to range of Flightradar24 coverage; it does not reflect ATC coverage.

Indonesia AirAsia Flight 8501 was a scheduled flight from Surabaya, East Java, Indonesia, to Singapore on Sunday, 28 December 2014. It was scheduled to depart Juanda International Airport at 05:20 Western Indonesian Time (WIB, UTC+7) and arrive at Singapore Changi Airport at 08:30 Singapore Standard Time (SST, UTC+8). The aircraft took off at 05:35 WIB and reached its cruising altitude at flight level (FL) 320 at 9,800 metres (32,000 ft) fourteen minutes later. It joined air route M635, heading north-west out over the western Java Sea. The plane was in contact with Jakarta air traffic control (ATC).

The flight was normal until 06:00 when an electronic centralised aircraft monitor (ECAM) memo was displayed, along with a master caution light, to indicate a fault with the rudder limiter system. Captain Iriyanto read the actions for fixing this failure, and rebooted the aircraft's two Flight Augmentation Computers (FACs). The same fault recurred at 06:09, and the captain fixed it in the same way.

At 06:11, the pilots turned fifteen degrees to the left to avoid inclement weather, and contacted Jakarta ATC to request a climb to FL 380 at 12,000 metres (38,000 ft) for the same reason. The controller could not give immediate permission for this due to other aircraft in the vicinity, and instructed them to wait.

While the pilots were waiting for permission to climb, the rudder limiter problem occurred for a third time, and for the third time the captain reset the FAC computers. When the memo displayed for the fourth time, Captain Iriyanto decided to reset the FAC circuit breakers (CB). He had previously seen this action being performed by a ground engineer, and believed that it was acceptable to do so in flight.

The FAC circuit breakers were reset at 06:16:45, with immediate consequences, as this action not only reset the FAC computers but also disconnected the autopilot and autothrottle, and the flight control law changed from Normal to Alternate. It allowed the aircraft to roll to the left, and by the time First Officer Plesel reacted to this it was banked at 54 degrees.

First Officer Plesel, possibly spatially disoriented due to the roll sensation, over-corrected twice: first by making a sharp right bank input and then a sharp left bank input. After that, at 06:17, Plesel made a nose-up input on his side-stick, causing the aircraft to enter a steep climb at a 24-degree nose-up pitch. The captain gave a confusing direction to "pull down", which "bears an internal contradiction as 'pull' suggests up, while 'down' means down." In just 54 seconds, the aircraft climbed from 32,000 feet to 38,500 ft (11,700 m), exceeding a climb rate of 10,000 ft/min (50 m/s). It then entered a stall, at around 06:17:40, descending at a rate of up to 20,000 ft/min (100 m/s). The aircraft also began a turn to the left, forming at least one complete circle before disappearing from radar at 06:18:44. At 06:20:35, the flight data recorder stopped recording. The CVR stopped recording one second later, at 06:20:36. The aircraft crashed into the Java Sea and was destroyed. All 162 people on board were killed instantly upon impact.

Its last recorded position was over the Java Sea, Karimata Strait between the islands of Belitung and Kalimantan (3.3708°S 109.6911°E). The aircraft crashed in the Java Sea, Karimata Strait between the islands of Belitung and Borneo (3.623°S 109.712°E). The cockpit voice recorder captured multiple warnings, including a stall warning, sounding in the cockpit during the final minutes of the flight. No distress signal was sent from the aircraft. Search and rescue (SAR) operations were activated by the Indonesia National Search and Rescue Agency (Basarnas) from the Pangkal Pinang office.

== Aircraft ==
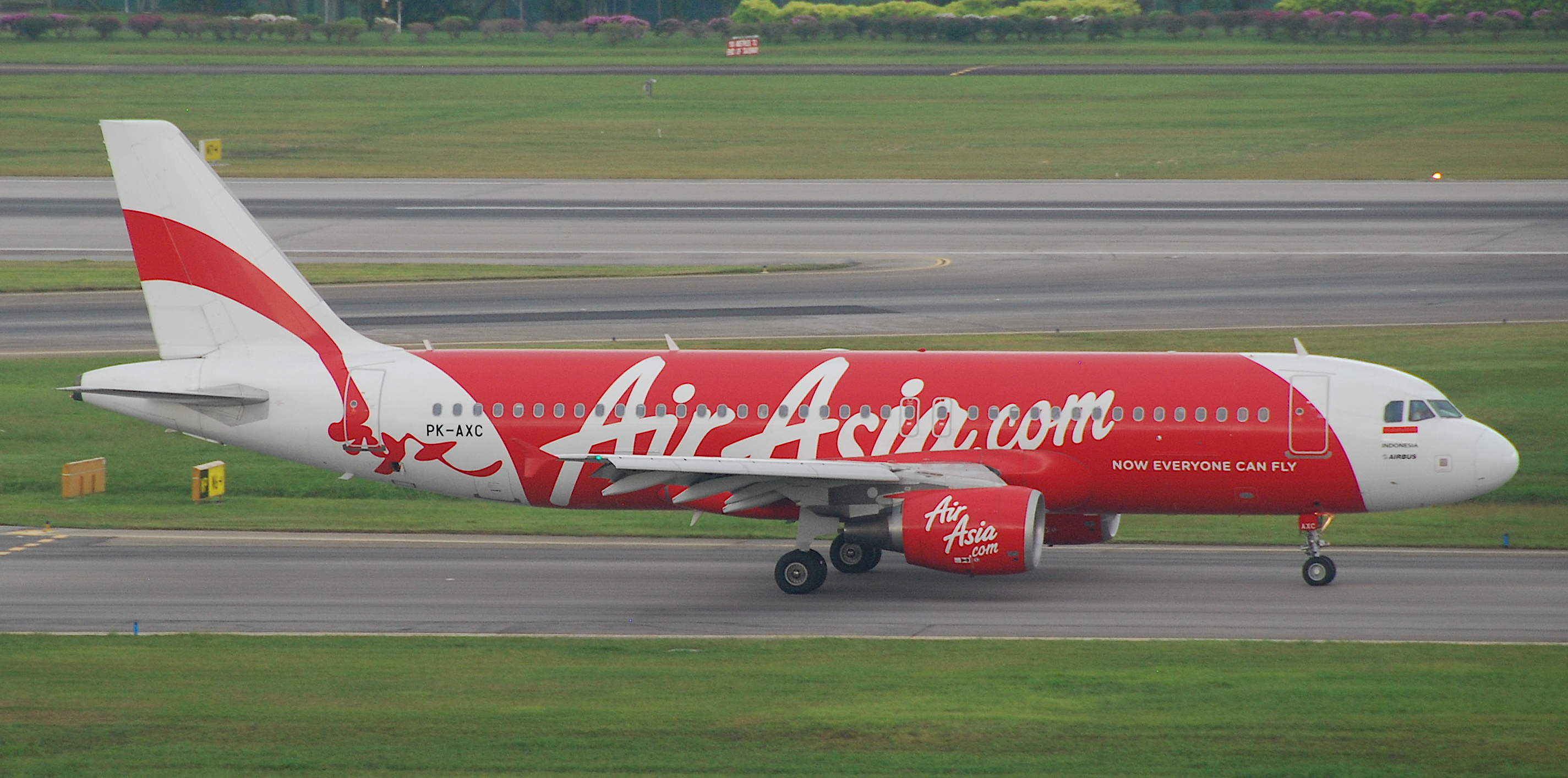
The aircraft involved in the accident, pictured in 2011 wearing the airline’s previous livery.

The aircraft was an Airbus A320-216, (Note: The aircraft was an Airbus A320-200 model; the 16 specifies it was fitted with CFM International CFM56-5B6 engines.) with serial number 3648, registered as PK-AXC. It first flew on 25 September 2008, and was delivered to AirAsia on 15 October 2008. The aircraft was six years old and had accumulated approximately 23,039 airframe hours and around 13,610 takeoff and landing cycles. It had undergone its most recent scheduled maintenance on 16 November 2014. The aircraft was powered by two CFM International CFM56-5B6/3 engines and was configured to carry 180 passengers.

== Victims ==
People on board by nationality:
Nationality	Passengers	Crew	Total
Indonesia	149	6 (Note: Including the captain)	155
South Korea	3	0	3
France	0	1 (Note: The first officer)	1
Malaysia	1	0	1
Singapore	1	0	1
United Kingdom	1 (Note: British citizen who resided in Hong Kong.)	0	1
Total (6 nationalities)	155	7	162

AirAsia released details of the 155 passengers, which included 137 adults, 17 children, and one infant. The crew consisted of two pilots, four flight attendants and an engineer.

The passengers on board were mostly Indonesian with 3 passengers from South Korea and one each from Malaysia, Singapore, and the United Kingdom.

The pilots on board the flight were:

- Captain Iriyanto, (Note: Iriyanto is a mononym (one-word name), which is common for Indonesian names.) age 53, an Indonesian national, had a total of 20,537 flying hours, of which 4,687 hours were on the Airbus A320. The captain began his career with the Indonesian Air Force, graduating from pilot school in 1983 and previously flying fighter jet aircraft. He took early retirement from the air force in the mid-1990s to join Merpati Nusantara Airlines, and later worked for Adam Air and Sriwijaya Air before joining Indonesia AirAsia. He had 6,100 flying hours with Indonesia AirAsia.
- First Officer Rémi Emmanuel Plesel, age 46, a French national, had a total of 2,247 flying hours, including 1,367 hours on the Airbus A320. He was originally from Le Marigot, Martinique, and had studied and worked as an engineer in Paris. At 44, he left his previous job to fulfill a childhood dream of becoming a pilot. Indonesia AirAsia was the first airline he had worked for. He was living in Indonesia.

Forty-one people who were on board the AirAsia flight were members of a single church congregation: the Gereja Mawar Sharon in Surabaya. Most were families with young children travelling to Singapore for a new year's holiday.

One of the passengers was Florentina Maria Widodo, a 26-year-old Biology and Project Work teacher at Hwa Chong Institution in Singapore. In her memory, the school later established the Florentina Maria Widodo Award, which recognises beginning or young teachers who demonstrate dedication to inspiring and developing their students.

The bodies began to be returned to their families on 1 January 2015. At that time, the East Java Regional Police Department's Disaster Victim Identification commissioner stated that the victims were identified by the means of post mortem results, thumb prints, and their personal belongings.

AirAsia offered US$32,000 or Rp300 million to each of the grieving family members of the victims of the accident as initial compensation from an overall part of compensation. David Thejakusuma, who had 7 family members on the flight, received the amount for each family member he lost.

On 16 March 2015, Monash University posthumously awarded a Bachelor of Commerce to one of the crash victims, Kevin Alexander Sujipto. Professor Colm Kearney, Dean of the Faculty of Business and Economics, presented it to a member of his family. A memorial service was held alongside the presentation of the award, and was attended by the Consul General of Indonesia for Victoria and Tasmania, Dewi Savitri Wahab, 40 of the deceased's friends and representatives from the Indonesian Student Association in Australia (PPIA) Monash University branch.

On 28 December 2015, the first anniversary of the crash, a private prayer service was held in a room in the Mahameru Building of the East Java Regional Police, Surabaya, and was attended by relatives of the victims, as well as by the Head Chief of the Search and Rescue Agency, Henry Bambang Soelistyo. Representatives of the family members asked the National Transportation Safety Committee to ensure the safety of air travel in Indonesia. The Indonesian Government was also asked by the family members to ratify the Montreal Convention, which later occurred on 19 May 2017.

== Search and recovery ==
Shortly after the aircraft was confirmed to be missing, unconfirmed reports stated that wreckage had been found off the island of Belitung in Indonesia. Indonesia's National Search and Rescue Agency (Basarnas) deployed seven ships and two helicopters to search the shores of Belitung and Kalimantan. The Indonesian Navy and the provincial Indonesian National Police Air and Water Unit each sent out search and rescue teams. In addition, an Indonesian Air Force Boeing 737 reconnaissance aircraft was dispatched to the last known location of the airliner.

The Indonesian Navy dispatched four ships by the end of the first search day and the Air Force deployed aircraft including a CASA/IPTN CN-235. The Indonesian Army deployed ground troops to search the shores and mountains of adjacent islands. Local fishermen also participated in the search.

Search and rescue operations were under the guidance of the Civil Aviation Authority of Indonesia. The search was suspended at 7:45 pm local time on 28 December due to darkness and bad weather, to be resumed in daylight. An operations center to coordinate search efforts was set up in Pangkal Pinang. The search area was a 270-nautical-mile (500 km) radius near Belitung Island.

Search and rescue operations quickly became an international effort. By 30 December naval and air units from Singapore, Malaysia and Australia had joined Indonesian authorities in patrolling designated search areas. Singapore's Rescue Coordination Centre (RCC) deployed three C-130 Hercules aircraft to aid in the search and rescue operation. RSS Supreme, RSS Valour, RSS Persistence, and MV Swift Rescue subsequently took part in the search and rescue after Indonesia's National Search and Rescue Agency accepted the offer of help from the Republic of Singapore Navy. Singapore's Ministry of Transport provided specialist teams from the Air Accident and Investigation Bureau and underwater locator equipment. The Malaysian government set up a rescue coordination centre at Subang and deployed three military vessels and three aircraft, including a C-130, to assist in search and rescue operations. Australia deployed a P-3 Orion to assist in the search and rescue operation. Elements of the United States Navy joined the search effort; USS Sampson arrived on station late on 30 December, and USS Fort Worth on 3 January.

More than ninety vessels and aircraft from Indonesia, Singapore, Malaysia, Australia, South Korea, Japan, China, the United States, and Russia participated in the search. This fleet included three ships with underwater detectors and two fuel tankers seconded to ensure efficient operation of the vessels in the search area. On 2 January the Indonesian Ministry of Transport reported that two other Indonesian tender vessels had been fitted with equipment that could detect acoustic signals from the flight recorder ("black box") beacons and airframe metal, as well as multibeam side scan sonar.

By 5 January 31 bodies had been recovered with the aid of the Russian and the US search teams. Divers entered the main section of the fuselage underwater and discovered six bodies on 24 January. The official search for bodies ended on 17 March, after 116 bodies had been recovered. 46 bodies remained unaccounted for.

=== Wreckage ===
On the day of the disappearance, a fisherman observed "a lot of debris, small and large, near Pulau Tujuh. [...] It looked like the AirAsia colours." Another fisherman reported that, while moored on Sunday at Pulau Senggora, south of the town of Pangkalan Bun in Central Kalimantan, "Around 7 am, I heard a loud booming sound. Soon afterwards, there was haze that usually happened only during the dry season. [...] Before the exploding sound, my friends saw a plane from above Pulau Senggaro heading towards the sea. The plane was said to be flying relatively low, but then disappeared."

The fisherman's reports, delivered after he had returned home the next day, were credited with guiding the search-and-rescue team to the vicinity of the crash. The first items of wreckage were spotted by search aircraft on 30 December in the Karimata Strait, 10 km (6.2 mi; 5.4 nmi) from where the crew last contacted air traffic control, and three bodies were recovered by the warship KRI Bung Tomo. (Note: At 10:05 UTC, Reuters, quoting Indonesian official Manahan Simorangkir, reported that 40 bodies had been recovered, but this was later retracted by an Indonesian navy spokesman as a "miscommunication by staff".)

On 31 December, Basarnas claimed that a sonar image obtained 30 December by an Indonesian naval ship appeared to show an aircraft upside down on the seabed in about 24–30 m (80–100 ft) of water, about 3.2–3.5 km (2.0–2.2 mi; 1.7–1.9 nmi) from the debris found on 30 December. The head of the Search and Rescue Agency also denied the existence of any sonar images of the wreckage (as well as the reported recovery of a body wearing a life vest). He stressed that only official information from his search-and-rescue service can be considered to be reliable.

On 2 January 2015, Basarnas reported evidence of a fuel slick on the water surface in the search area, but detection of the fuselage remained unconfirmed.

At a press conference given on the morning of 3 January by Basarnas, the discovery of two large submerged objects was reported: 9.4 m × 4.8 m × 0.4 m (30.8 ft × 15.7 ft × 1.3 ft), and a thin object 7.2 m × 0.5 m (23.6 ft × 1.6 ft). Also, the previously reported fuel slick was confirmed. A later media report mentioned four large sections of wreckage, the largest being 18 m × 5.4 m × 2.2 m (59.1 ft × 17.7 ft × 7.2 ft) located at 3.9242°S 110.5252°E. Later in the day, Basarnas announced no more bodies had been found, leaving the total at 30.

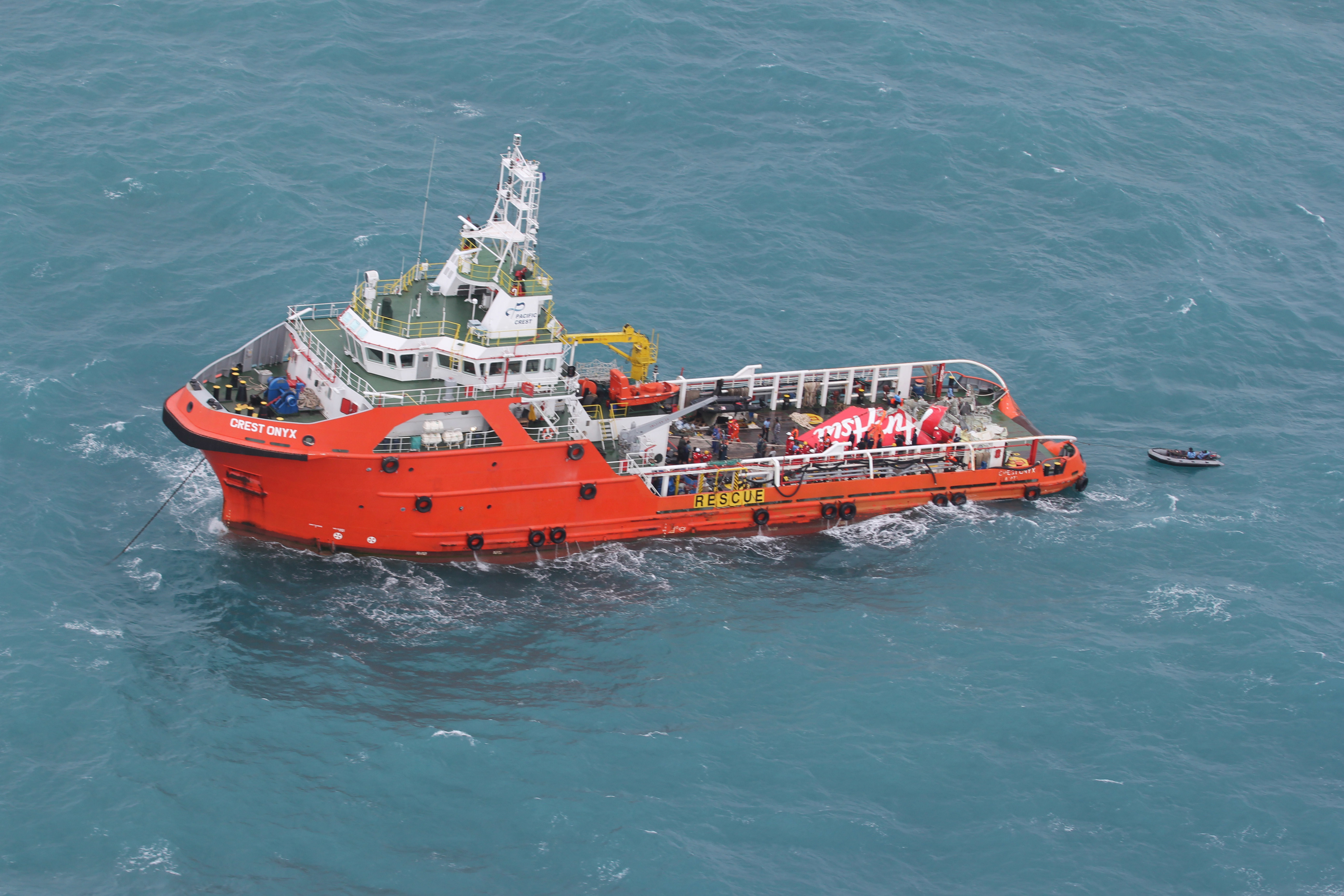
An offshore supply ship with the tail of PK-AXC on its stern on 10 January 2015

On 7 January, divers found parts of the aircraft, including a section of the tail. On 10 January, divers used an inflatable device to bring the aircraft's tail to the surface of the sea. They continued to search the sea floor within 500 m (1,600 ft) of where faint pings were heard.

The flight data recorder was recovered by Indonesian divers on 12 January at 3.6225°S 109.7117°E, within 4 km (2.5 mi) of part of the fuselage and tail. Later in the day, the cockpit voice recorder was located and was recovered the following day.

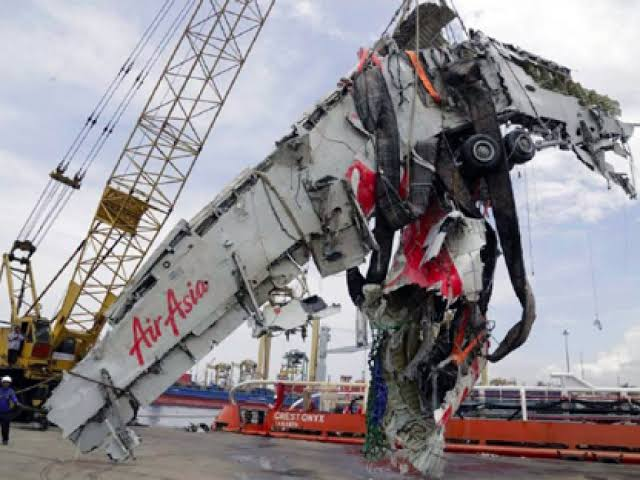
Wingbox of the aircraft recovered from the Java Sea

On 14 January, the Republic of Singapore's navy submarine rescue vessel MV Swift Rescue located a large section of the fuselage with one wing attached. On 25 January, ropes around the fuselage snapped during an initial failed effort to raise the wreckage. Four bodies were recovered, taking the total recovered to 69. More bodies were thought to be inside. Rear Admiral Widodo, who was in charge of recovery operations, said that the fuselage might be too fragile to be lifted.

On 27 February, salvage workers recovered a large piece of fuselage, including the wings, of the A320. Lifting balloons were used to lift the fuselage, but the first attempt failed as the balloons deflated. By March 2015, all large pieces of fuselage from the jet had been lifted from the seafloor and moved for investigative purposes.

== Aftermath ==
=== AirAsia ===
An emergency call center was established by the airline for the families of those who were on board the aircraft, and an emergency information center was set up at Juanda International Airport to provide hourly updates as well as lodging for victims' relatives. Smaller posts were also opened at Soekarno–Hatta International Airport and Sultan Hasanuddin International Airport.

On 31 December 2014, Indonesia AirAsia retired the flight number QZ8501, changing the designation of its Surabaya-Singapore route to QZ678. The return flight number was also changed, from QZ8502 to QZ679. The Surabaya-Singapore route by AirAsia was then terminated on 4 January 2015. The route was reopened on 25 March 2023, with flight number QZ478 serving the sector. But as of May 2024, the route has been suspended again.

Subsequent to the 1 December 2015 NTSC report as to the causes of the crash, the airline said it had already implemented improved pilot training.

=== Indonesia ===
AirAsia did not have any official permission to fly the Surabaya–Singapore route on Sunday – the day of the crash – but was licensed on four other days of the week, and, according to an Indonesian Ministry of Transport statement, "The Indonesian authorities are suspending the company's flights on this route with immediate effect pending an investigation." In response on the same day, the Civil Aviation Authority of Singapore (CAAS) and the Changi Airport Group (CAG) made a clarification that AirAsia QZ8501 "has been given approval at Singapore's end to operate a daily flight for the Northern Winter Season from 26 October 2014 to 28 March 2015".

On 6 January 2015, Indonesian Ministry of Transport representative Djoko Murjatmojo stated that "officials at the airport operator in Surabaya and [the] air traffic control agency who had allowed the flight to take off had been moved to other duties", and an immediate air transport directive had been issued "making it mandatory for pilots to go through a face-to-face briefing by an airline flight operations officer on weather conditions and other operational issues prior to every flight".

The loss of Flight 8501 also brought attention to the lack of weather radar at Indonesian air traffic control centres. According to the Toronto Star, "Indonesia's aviation industry has been plagued with problems ... pilot shortages, shoddy maintenance and poor oversight have all been blamed following a string of deadly accidents in recent years."

The West Kotawaringin Regency administration in Central Kalimantan planned to build a memorial for the AirAsia flight that also doubles as a monument for aviation safety. Central Kalimantan deputy governor Achmad Diran stated that the monument is also going to be the symbol of gratitude and appreciation for the efforts of the National Search and Rescue Agency. The cornerstone ceremony was attended by local and state officials and representatives from Australia and Singapore. West Kotawaringin regent Ujang Iskandar said that with the monument, "we hope that the families and the government will lay flowers every 28 December, and continue the dialogue on aviation safety in Indonesia." On 22 March, Indonesia's search and rescue agency's head, Bambang Soelistyo, families of the victims and AirAsia officials visited the crash site to spread flowers and hold prayers.

=== Legal proceedings ===
France opened a criminal investigation to investigate possible manslaughter charges. The family of the first officer, a French national, have filed a lawsuit against AirAsia in connection to the lack of permission to fly on that day, claiming the airline was "endangering the life of others".

Surabaya mayor Tri Rismaharini said her administration had consulted with legal experts from Airlangga University on the fears of most families regarding the difficulties in disbursing insurance funds, after the Transportation Ministry regarded the Surabaya-Singapore flight on 28 Dec as illegal. She said her administration continued to collect data on the victims, including their valuable belongings. The data would later be used for insurance purposes and matters related to the beneficiary rights of the affected families.

The families of ten of the victims filed a suit against Airbus and some of its suppliers, alleging that A320 suffered a malfunction of the fly-by-wire system, and that "at the time the accident aircraft left the control of defendant Airbus, it was defectively and unreasonably dangerous". The case (Aris Siswanto et al. v Airbus, SAS et al., 1:15-cv-05486) was dismissed by the Illinois court on the grounds that it would be more appropriate for the case to be heard in Indonesia.

=== Air transport industry ===
Following the recovery of the flight recorders, on 12 and 13 January, an anonymous International Civil Aviation Organization (ICAO) representative said, "The time has come that deployable recorders are going to get a serious look." Unlike military recorders, which jettison away from an aircraft and float on the water, signalling their location to search and rescue bodies, recorders on commercial aircraft sink. A second ICAO official said that public attention had "galvanized momentum in favour of ejectable recorders on commercial aircraft".

=== Indonesian tourism ===
Figures from the Indonesian Ministry of Tourism showed that the number of foreign tourists arriving at Surabaya's Juanda Airport was 5.33% lower in February 2015 compared to February 2014, 15.01% down at Jakarta's Soekarno-Hatta International Airport, and 10.66% at Bandung's Husein Sastranegara Airport. The head of Indonesia's Central Statistics Agency (CSA) Suryamin attributed the decrease to the revocation of a number of flight licences in the wake of the accident. By contrast, foreign visitors into Indonesia as a whole increased by 3.71%.

== Investigation ==
The events leading to the crash were investigated by Indonesia's National Transportation Safety Committee (KNKT or NTSC). Assistance was provided by Australia, France, Singapore, and Malaysia.

Data from the flight data recorder was downloaded. Although the aircraft's route took it through areas of cloud that extended from 12,000 ft (3,700 m) up to 44,000 ft (13,000 m), FDR data showed that weather was not a factor in the accident. (Note: The Indonesian Agency for Meteorology, Climatology and Geophysics speculated in the days immediately after the accident that atmospheric icing that "can cause engine damage due to a cooling process" was believed to be a significant factor, but this proved to be incorrect.)

124 minutes of cockpit dialogue was successfully extracted from the cockpit voice recorder. The sound of many alarms from the flight system can be heard in the final minutes, almost drowning out the voices of the pilots. The investigators ruled out a terrorist attack as the cause and then examined the possibility of human error or aircraft malfunction.

Acting director of Air Transportation, Djoko Murjatmodjo, clearly stated that the investigation of the flight route and the investigation of the crash itself are separate. Murjatmodjo said that "AirAsia is clearly wrong because they didn't fly at a time and schedule that was already determined." Both Singapore's civil aviation authority and the Changi Airport Group stated that AirAsia was allowed daily flights between Surabaya and Singapore. Tatang Kurniadi, head of Indonesia's National Transportation Safety Committee, stated that sabotage was ruled out as a cause of the accident by the black boxes, and a preliminary report was supposedly submitted to the International Civil Aviation Organisation by early February.

=== Final NTSC report ===
After studying the wreckage of the Airbus A320-216 as well as the two black boxes and the cockpit recorder, Indonesia's National Transportation Safety Committee issued a report with their conclusions from the investigation on 1 December 2015. The report stated that the sequence of events that led to the crash started with a malfunction in two of the plane's rudder travel limiter units (RTLU). A tiny soldered electrical connection in the plane's RTLU was found to be cracked, likely for over a year, causing it to intermittently send amber master caution warnings to the electronic centralised aircraft monitor (ECAM)—with the plane's maintenance records showing that the RTLU warning had been sent 23 times over the previous year, but was always solved (and never further investigated, which could have addressed the underlying electrical problem) by resetting the RTLU system. On this flight, the RTLU issue sent an amber caution warning four different times, and the first three times that the ECAM system gave the warning "Auto Flight Rudder Travel Limiter System", the pilot in command followed the ECAM instructions, toggling the flight augmentation computer (FAC) 1 and 2 buttons on the cockpit's overhead panel to off and then on. This procedure did clear the amber master caution warnings for each of those first three warnings.

Specifics in the report indicate that French First Officer Rémi Emmanuel Plesel was at the controls just before the stall warning sounded in the cockpit indicating that the jet was at risk of stalling. Investigators also found that, just moments earlier—on the fourth occurrence of the RTLU warning during the flight—the captain chose to ignore the procedure advised by the ECAM instructions, and, instead, left his seat and reset the circuit breaker of the entire FAC, unintentionally disengaging multiple flight control systems, which would have to be turned on by the pilots after the circuit breakers are reset. This circuit breaker is not on the list of circuit breakers that are allowed to be reset in flight, (Note: Page 106: "The FAC CBs were not included in the list of the CB allowed in OEB and TDUs to be reset in flight.") and disabling both FACs placed the aircraft in alternate law mode, disengaging the autopilot and stopping the automatic stall protection and bank angle protection. The FAC is the part of the fly-by-wire system in A320 aircraft responsible for controlling flight surfaces including the rudder. Without the FAC's computerized flight augmentation, pilots would have to "rely on manual flying skills that are often stretched during a sudden airborne emergency". When the crew was required to fly the Airbus A320 manually, there was an unexplained nine-second delay between the start of the roll and either pilot attempting to take control. After nine seconds, the aircraft was banking at a 54° angle: the rudder had deflected 2 degrees to the left, causing the aircraft to roll. Subsequent flight crew actions resulted in the aircraft entering a prolonged stall from which they were unable to recover.

The report did not specifically conclude that pilot error caused the crash while detailing the chain of events leading to the loss of Flight 8501. One of the investigators, the NTSC's Nurcahyo Utomo, referred to an apparent miscommunication between the pilots (based on the recordings on the cockpit voice recorder) and said that the malfunction should not have led to a total loss of control had they followed the recommended procedure.

==== Side-stick control issue ====
The example of miscommunication between the pilots was when the plane was in a critical stalling condition, the co-pilot misunderstood the captain's command "pull down"; instead of pushing the airplane's nose down (pushing forward on the stick to regain speed and escape the stall), he pulled the stick back, which would have ordered the aircraft to pitch up, deepening the stall. Because the captain was also pushing the stick forward and because Airbus has a dual-input system, the two stick inputs cancelled each other out, which led to the plane remaining in a stall condition until the end of the black box recording. On 3 December 2015, Indonesia's air transportation director general, Suprasetyo, said that the National Safety Transportation Committee (KNKT) had provided recommendations as to tightened controls on aircraft maintenance and flight crew competence. He added that the government had implemented "... a series of corrective actions as a preventive measure so that the same accident will not happen again in the future." Suprasetyo also confirmed that the suspension of Indonesia AirAsia's Surabaya–Singapore route would not be lifted until the carrier had completed the steps recommended by the KNKT.

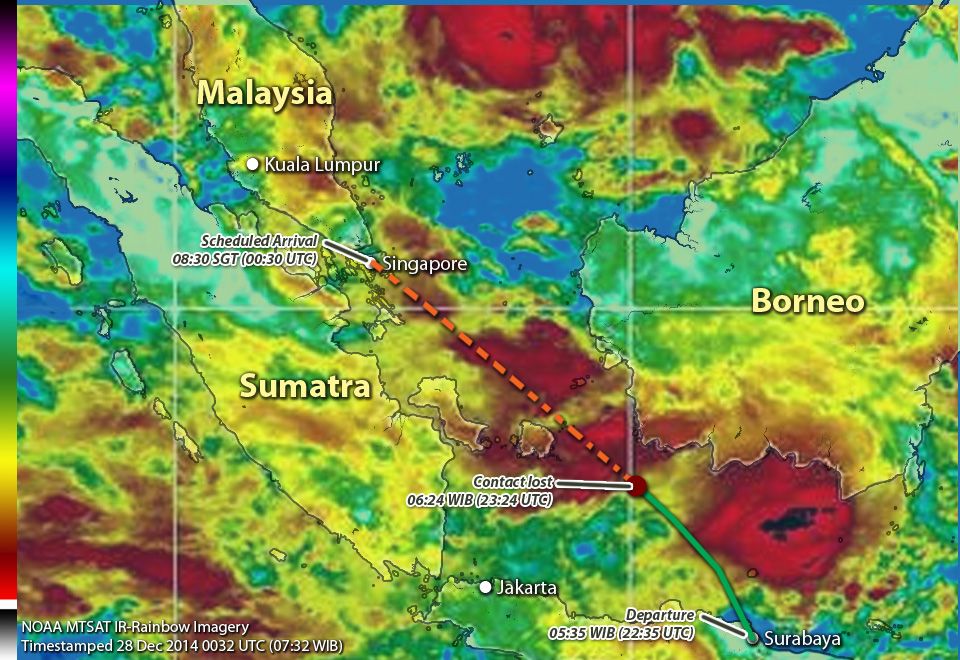
Infrared satellite imagery (taken at 7:32 WIB) with flight path superimposed on the right. On this false-colour image, blue represents warmer temperatures, while red and ultimately black represent the cold tops of high-altitude clouds.

Secondary radar image shows Flight 8501 (circled in yellow) at an altitude of 36,300 ft (11,100 m) and climbing, travelling at 353 kn (654 km/h; 406 mph) ground speed.

== Dramatization ==
The crash was dramatized in the 16th season of the TV Series Mayday, in an episode entitled "Deadly Solution", aired just over two years after the crash on 6 February 2017. Also, Science Channel aired a documentary on 28 April 2015 called "AirAsia 8501: Anatomy of a Crash".

== See also ==
- Air France Flight 447 – a 2009 fatal crash involving an Airbus A330, crashed into the sea following pilot error and mishandled equipment malfunction leading to stall
- West Caribbean Airways Flight 708 - a 2005 fatal crash involving an MD-82, which also crashed following a high-altitude stall due to pilot error.
- List of aircraft accidents and incidents resulting in at least 50 fatalities
