= McElligott =

McElligott is a surname. Notable people with the surname include:

- Bernard McElligott, Irish hurler and Gaelic footballer
- Dominique McElligott (born 1986), Irish actress
- John J. McElligott (1882–1946), American Fire Commissioner
- John L. McElligott (born 1958), Irish Gaelic footballer
- Ken McElligott (1940–2021), Australian politician
- Sarah Isabella McElligott (1883–1986), New Zealand cook
