= Vertical stabilizer =

Aircraft component

The vertical stabilizer is the fixed vertical surface of the empennage

A vertical stabilizer or tail fin is the static part of the vertical tail of an aircraft. The term is commonly applied to the assembly of both this fixed surface and one or more movable rudders hinged to it. Their role is to provide control, stability and trim in yaw (also known as directional or weathercock stability). It is part of the aircraft empennage, specifically of its stabilizers.

The vertical tail is typically mounted on top of the rear fuselage, with the horizontal stabilizers mounted on the side of the fuselage (a configuration termed "conventional tail"). Other configurations, such as T-tail or twin tail, are sometimes used instead.

Vertical stabilizers have occasionally been used in motor sports, with for example in Le Mans Prototype racing.

== Function ==
=== Principle ===
Control surfaces at the tail of a conventional aircraft

The vertical tail of an aircraft typically consists of a fixed vertical stabilizer or fin on which a movable rudder is mounted. A trim tab may similarly be mounted on the rudder. Together, their role is to enable trim in the yaw direction (compensate moments in yaw generated by any asymmetry in thrust or drag), enable the aircraft to be controlled in yaw (for example, to initiate side slip during a crosswind landing), as well as provide stability in yaw (weathercock or directional stability).

The greater its position away from the center of gravity, the more effective the vertical tail can be. Thus, shorter aircraft typically feature larger vertical tails; for example, the vertical tail of the short Airbus A318 is larger than that of its longer counterparts in the A320 family.

The effectiveness of the vertical tail depends on its efficiency and the vertical tail volume coefficient (also called volume ratio), which non-dimensionalizes its area and arm with the dimensions of the main wing:

$V_\text{v} = \frac{S_\text{v} L_\text{tail-CG}}{S_\text{w} L_\text{w}}$

(where the indices $V$ and $W$ stand for vertical tail and wing respectively, $S$ stands for area, and $L_\text{w}$ is typically the mean aerodynamic chord). Values for the vertical tail coefficient vary only mildly from aircraft one type of aircraft to another, with extreme values ranging from 0.02 (sailplane) to 0.09 (jet aircraft transport).

The tail efficiency is the ratio of the dynamic pressure at the tail to that in the freestream. The tail has its maximum capability when immersed in the free stream with an efficiency of one. When partially immersed in a wake its effectiveness is reduced because the wake has a lower dynamic pressure than the free stream. The fin height may need to be increased to restore its required effectiveness in certain flight conditions. The Panavia Tornado had a tall fin for directional stability at high angles of incidence.

=== Trim and control in yaw ===
The rudder is the directional control surface and is usually hinged to the fin or vertical stabilizer. Moving it allows the pilot to control yaw about the vertical axis, i.e., change the horizontal direction in which the nose is pointing.

Maximum rudder deflection is usually controlled by a rudder travel limiter. The largest achievable angle of a rudder at a particular flight condition is called its blowdown limit. It represents a balance between the aerodynamic forces on the rudder and the mechanical forces from the actuating mechanism.

Multi-engined aircraft, especially those with wing-mounted engines, have large powerful rudders. They are required to provide sufficient control after an engine failure on take-off at maximum weight and cross wind limit and cross-wind capability on normal take-off and landing.

For taxiing and during the beginning of the take-off, aircraft are steered by a combination of rudder input as well as turning the nosewheel or tailwheel. At slow speeds the nosewheel or tailwheel has the most control authority, but as the speed increases the aerodynamic effects of the rudder increases, thereby making the rudder more and more important for yaw control. In some aircraft (mainly small aircraft) both of these mechanisms are controlled by the rudder pedals so there is no difference to the pilot. In other aircraft there is a special tiller controlling the wheel steering and the pedals control the rudder, and a limited amount of wheel steering (usually 5 degrees of nosewheel steering). For these aircraft the pilots stop using the tiller after lining up with the runway prior to take-off, and begin using it after landing before turning off the runway, to prevent over correcting with the sensitive tiller at high speeds. The pedals may also be used for small corrections while taxiing in a straight line, or leading in or out of a turn, before applying the tiller, to keep the turn smooth.

With the controls in the neutral position, a plane may still gently yaw to one side. This is corrected through the setting of a trim surface, often a separate trim tab mounted on the rudder but sometimes the rudder itself, to counteract the yaw and ensure the plane flies in a straight line.

Changing the setting of a trim tab adjusts the neutral or resting position of a control surface (such as an elevator or rudder). As the desired position of a control surface changes (corresponding mainly to different speeds), an adjustable trim tab will allow the operator to reduce the manual force required to maintain that position—to zero, if used correctly. Thus the trim tab acts as a servo tab. Because the center of pressure of the trim tab is further away from the axis of rotation of the control surface than the center of pressure of the control surface, the movement generated by the tab can match the movement generated by the control surface. The position of the control surface on its axis will change until the torque from the control surface and the trim surface balance each other.

Movement caused by the use of rudder

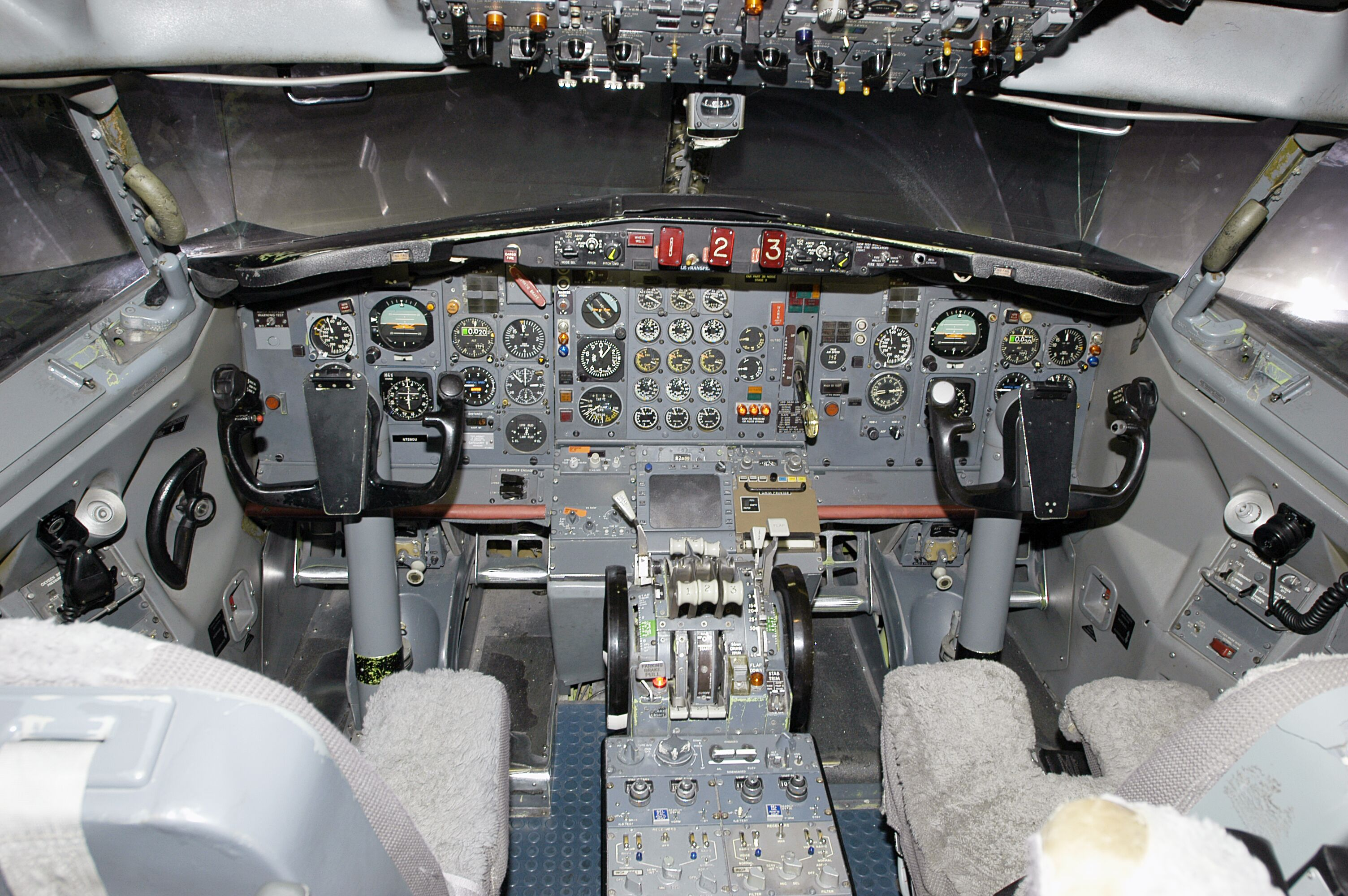
The rudder is controlled through rudder pedals on the bottom rear of the yoke in this photo of a Boeing 727 cockpit.

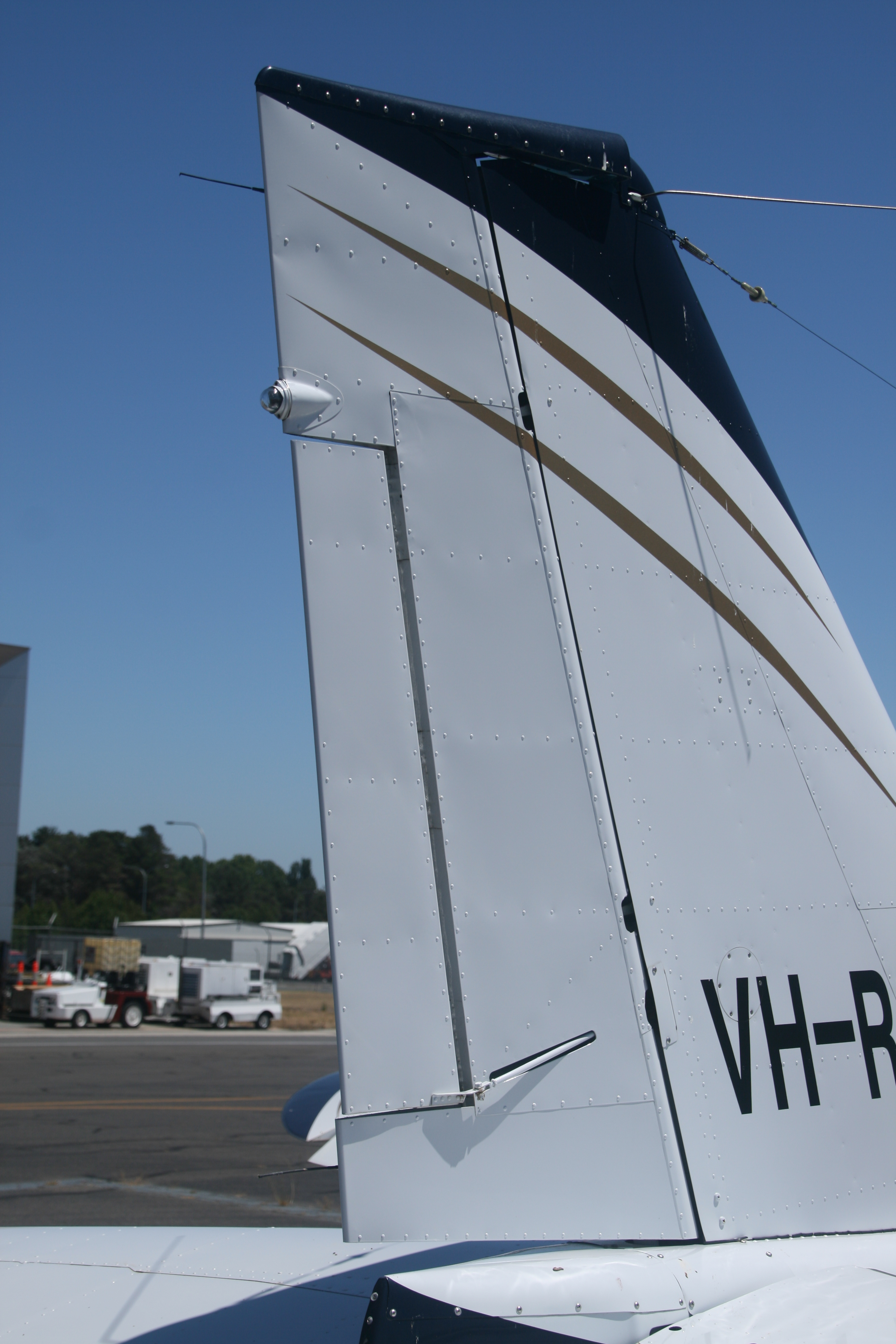
Rudder and trim tab on a light aircraft

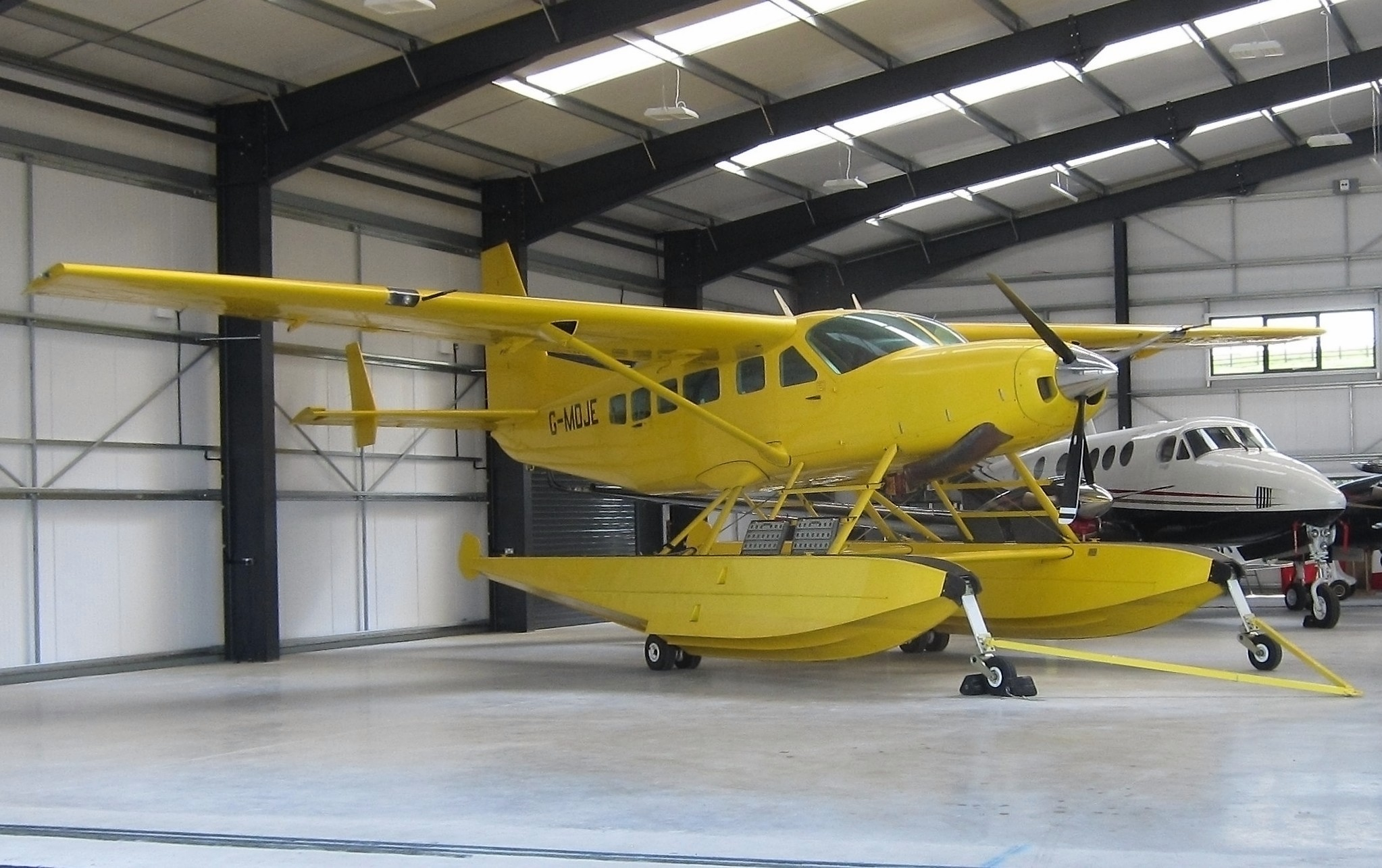
The water rudders on this Cessna 208 Caravan floatplane are the small vertical surfaces on the rear end of each float. Their setting is controlled from the cockpit.

=== Yaw stability ===
The vertical tail plays a determining role in yaw stability, providing most of the required restoring moment about the center of gravity when the aircraft slips. Yaw stability is typically quantified using the derivative of moment coefficient with respect to yaw angle.

The airflow over the vertical tail is often influenced by the fuselage, wings and engines of the aircraft, both in magnitude and direction. The main wing and the horizontal stabilizer, if they are highly swept, can contribute significantly to the yaw stability; wings swept backwards tend to increase yaw stability. Sweep in the wing and horizontal tail of a conventional airplane, however, does not affect airplane trim in yaw.

Dihedral in the main wing and horizontal tail can also have a small effect on the static yaw stability. This effect is complex and coupled with the effect of wing sweep and flow about the fuselage.

Propellers, especially when they are advancing so that their axis makes an angle to the freestream velocity, can affect the static stability of an airplane in yaw.

=== Coupling with roll ===
The vertical tail affects the behavior of the aircraft in roll, since its aerodynamic center typically lies far above the center of gravity of the aircraft. When the aircraft slips to the right, the relative wind and side force on the vertical tail translate into an anti-clockwise moment in roll.

=== Supersonic flight ===
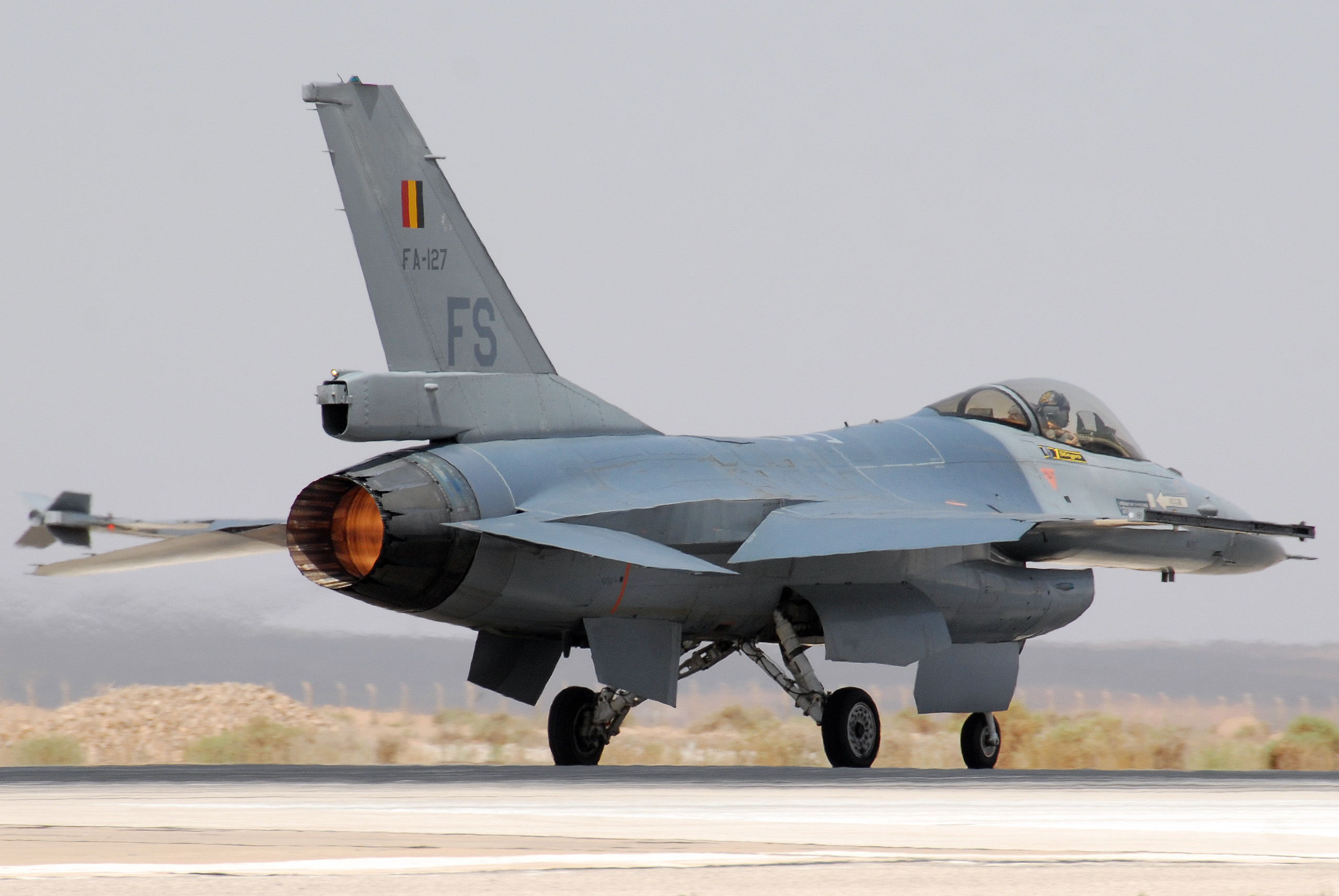
Dual ventral fins on an F-16

In supersonic flight, the vertical tail becomes progressively less effective with increasing Mach number until the loss of stability may no longer be acceptable. The stability is reduced because the lift, or side force, generated by the tail reduces with speed for each degree of sideslip angle (lift-curve slope). This results from the very different pressure distribution, with shock waves and expansion waves, compared to subsonic. To achieve the required stability at the maximum operating speed of the aircraft the vertical tail may be enlarged, such as on the North American F-100 Super Sabre (the initial fin area requirement was underestimated). Extra area may be added by installing ventral fins (such as on higher-speed, later versions of the Vought F-8 Crusader), or folding-down wingtips (such as on the North American XB-70 Valkyrie). If a bigger tail is not acceptable automatic rudder deflections may be used to increase the tail side force and restore directional stability. This method was used on the Avro Arrow.

=== Stall of the vertical tail ===
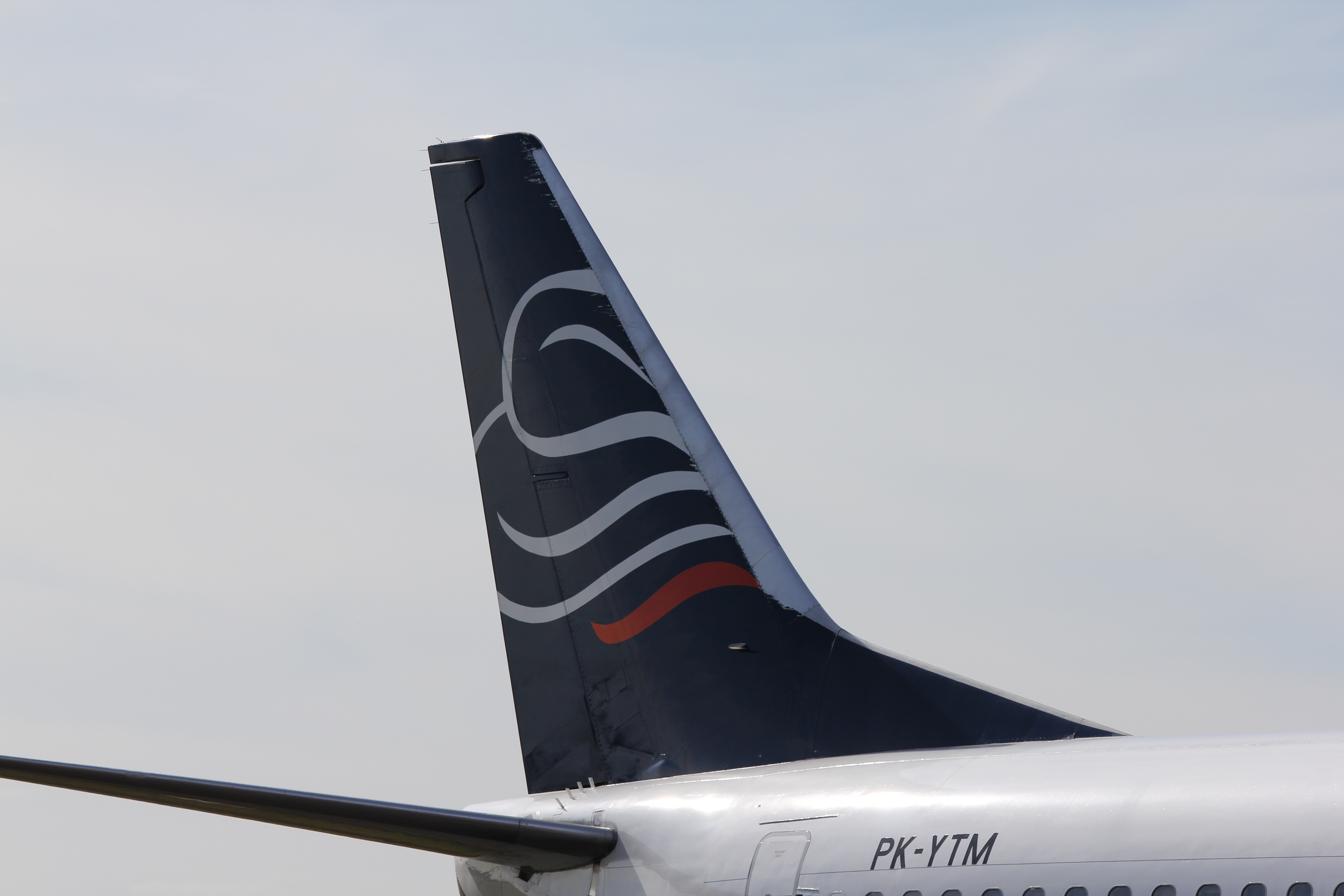
A dorsal fin is visible at the base of the vertical tail of this Boeing 737-300

The vertical tail sometimes features a fillet or dorsal fin at its forward base, which helps to increase the stall angle of the vertical surface (resulting in vortex lift), and in this way prevent a phenomenon called rudder lock or rudder reversal. Rudder lock occurs when the force on a deflected rudder (e.g. in a steady sideslip) suddenly reverses as the vertical tail stalls. This may leave the rudder stuck at full deflection with the pilot unable to recenter it. The dorsal fin was introduced in the 1940s, for example on the 1942 Douglas DC-4, predating the wing strakes of the fighter aircraft developed in the 1970s, such as the F-16.

=== Structural considerations ===
The rudder and fin on a large, or fast, aircraft are each subject to a considerable force which increases with rudder deflection. An extreme case occurs with a departure from controlled flight, known as an upset, which in the context of fin and rudder is excessive sideslip. For large transport aircraft the stabilizing moment necessary for recovery comes from the fin with little requirement for rudder deflection. These aircraft do not have a requirement to withstand near-full rudder deflections in these circumstances because the structural weight required to prevent structural failure would make them commercially unviable. Loss of the complete fin and rudder assembly occurred on American Airlines Flight 587 when the pilot used full rudder deflections while following in the wake of a very large jet.

Clear-air turbulence caused the failure of the complete fin and rudder assembly on a Boeing B-52 Stratofortress after which the pilots made a successful landing. B-52 bombers instrumented for gust and maneuver loads recorded gusts from clear-air turbulence considerably more than the design limit with highest loads at 34,000 feet.

The English Electric Lightning T4 prototype fin failure was caused by inertial roll coupling while doing high-rate rolls. The fin was enlarged, strengthened and roll-rate limitations were imposed. However, the first T5 also had a fin failure while doing rapid rolling trials with rocket pack extended.

A Lightning lost its fin due to interaction between aircraft in close proximity at low level when flying in formation at M 0.97, an aerobatic display routine. Limitations were imposed including separation between aircraft when in formation.

Fin buffeting is a critical issue for fighter aircraft with twin or single fins because the fatigue life of the fin structure is reduced by the fluctuating loads caused by burst vortices impinging on the fin. The single fin on the Eurofighter Typhoon experiences buffet loads caused by burst vortices which originate from the canard and wing leading edges at high angles of attack. The sides of the top-mounted airbrake, when deflected, also shed vortices which impinge, after bursting, on the fin. Buffeting from the extended airbrake is highest when the airbrake effective angle of attack is greatest, which for a fully-extended airbrake is greatest at low aircraft angle of attack and least when maneuvering. The McDonnell Douglas F/A-18 Hornet twin fins are subject to buffeting from the breakdown or bursting of the leading-edge extension (LEX) vortex in front of the tail. The addition of a LEX fence significantly reduces the buffeting and increases fin fatigue life.

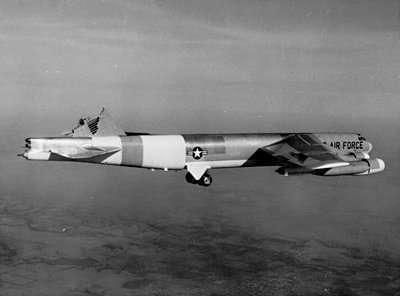
B-52H (AF Ser. No. 61-0023), instrumented to measure gust loads to investigate structural failures, still flying after its vertical stabilizer was lost in severe turbulence on 10 January 1964. The aircraft landed safely.

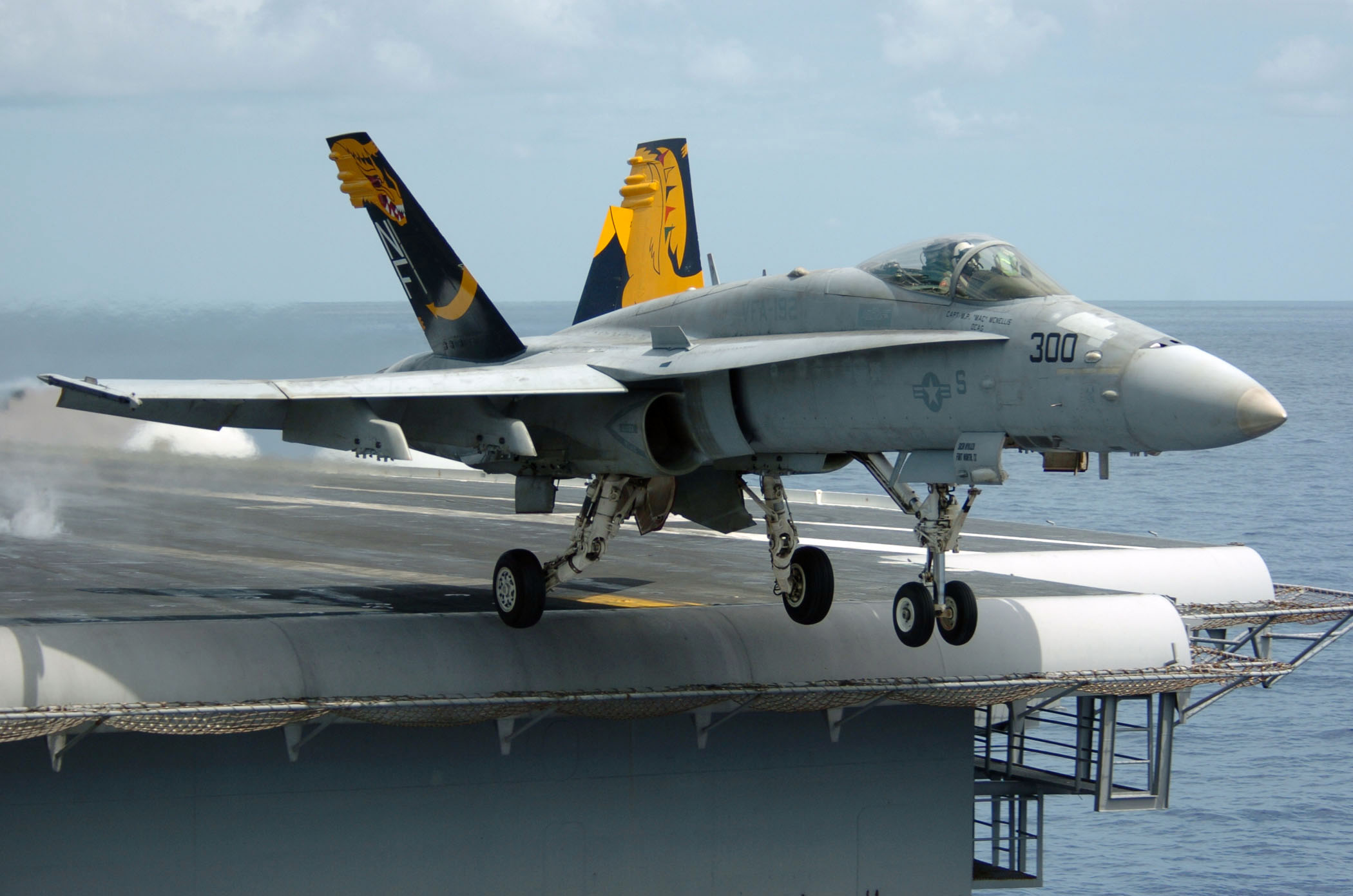
F/A-18C showing LEX fence which reduces fin buffeting

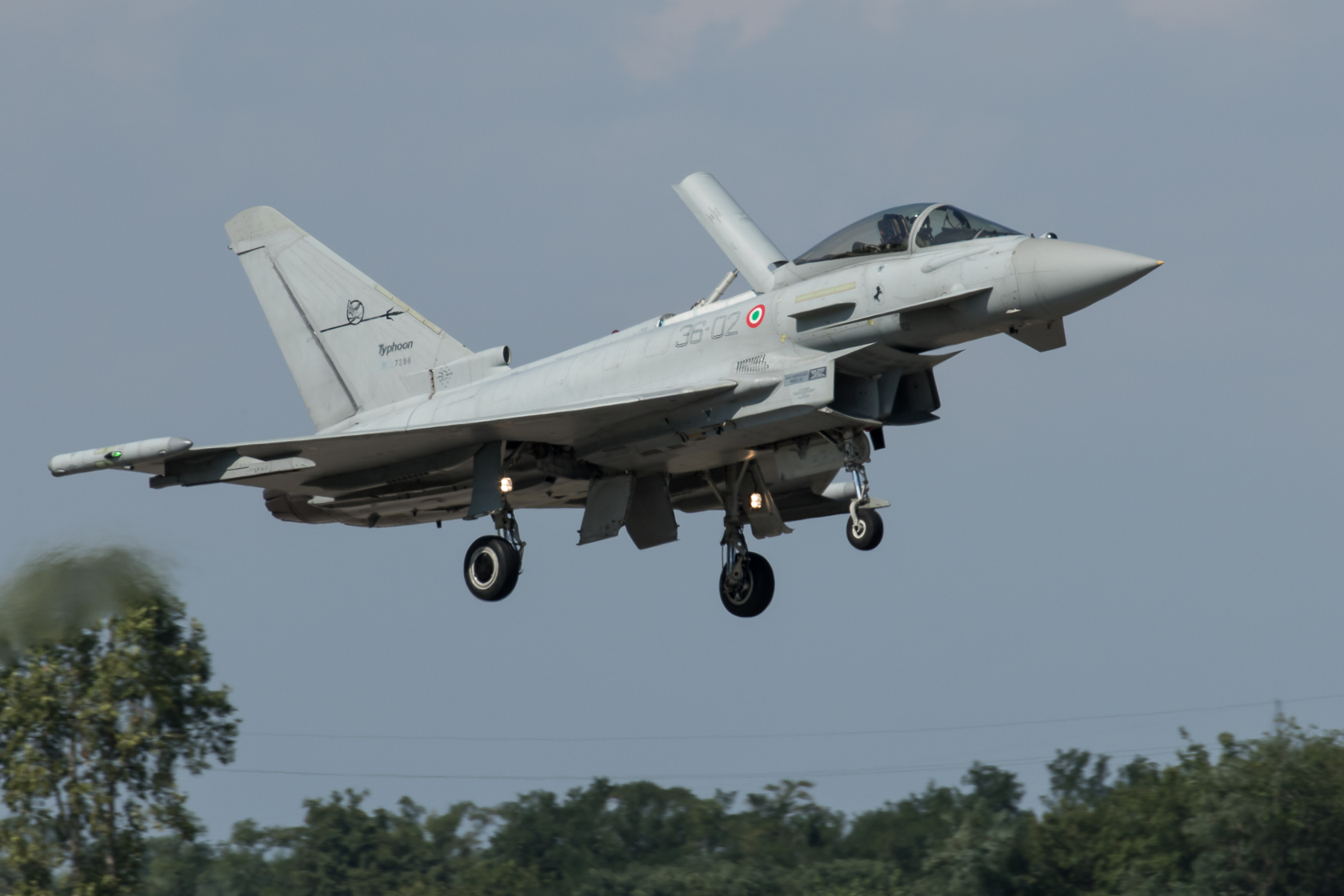
Typhoon showing extended airbrake which causes significant fin buffet

== Configurations ==
=== All-moving tail fin ===
Aircraft with all-moving fins, but which did not enter service, were the North American F-107 and the BAC TSR-2.

The Lockheed SR-71 Blackbird and North American X-15 used fixed stubs for the fins and rudders for the remaining height. Conventional rudders would have been inadequate for the SR-71 because excessive deflections would have been required for the engine-out case causing unacceptable trim drag. Early configurations put forward for the X-15 show a conventional fixed fin and trailing rudder, and a ventral fin. This was changed to dorsal and ventral fins each with the outer half acting as a rudder.

North American X-15 showing full-chord rudders on fixed dorsal and ventral stabilizers

The North American A-5 Vigilante used an all-moving vertical fin

=== Multiple tail fins ===
Twin tail aircraft have two vertical stabilizers. Many modern combat aircraft use this configuration. The twin rudders may be used in the gear-down configuration for additional longitudinal control with toe-in or flare-out (McDonnell Douglas F/A-18 Hornet). Twin rudders are also used as an airbrake as in the case of the Lockheed Martin F-22 Raptor which uses differential rudder, together with other control surface deflections, for speed control as it has no dedicated airbrake.

A twin tail may be either H-tail, twin fin/rudder construction attached to a single fuselage, such as North American B-25 Mitchell medium bomber or Avro Lancaster, or twin-boom where the rear airframe consists of two separate boom structures each with one single fin and rudder joined by a horizontal stabilizer, such as North American Rockwell OV-10 Bronco or Armstrong Whitworth AW.660 Argosy transport.

A variation on the twin tail, the triple tail has three vertical stabilizers. The WW II era Avro Manchester was given a third fin when the original twin fin proved insufficient. The Lockheed Constellation used three fins to give the airplane the required vertical stabilizer area while at the same time keeping the overall height low enough so that it could fit into hangars for maintenance.

A V-tail has no distinct vertical or horizontal stabilizers. Rather, they are merged into control surfaces known as ruddervators which control both pitch and yaw. The arrangement looks like the letter V, and is also known as a "butterfly tail". The Beechcraft Bonanza Model 35 uses this configuration, as does the Lockheed F-117 Nighthawk.

Winglets on the canard pusher configuration Rutan VariEze and Rutan Long-EZ, acting as both a wingtip device and a vertical stabilizer. Several other derivatives of these and other similar aircraft use this design element.

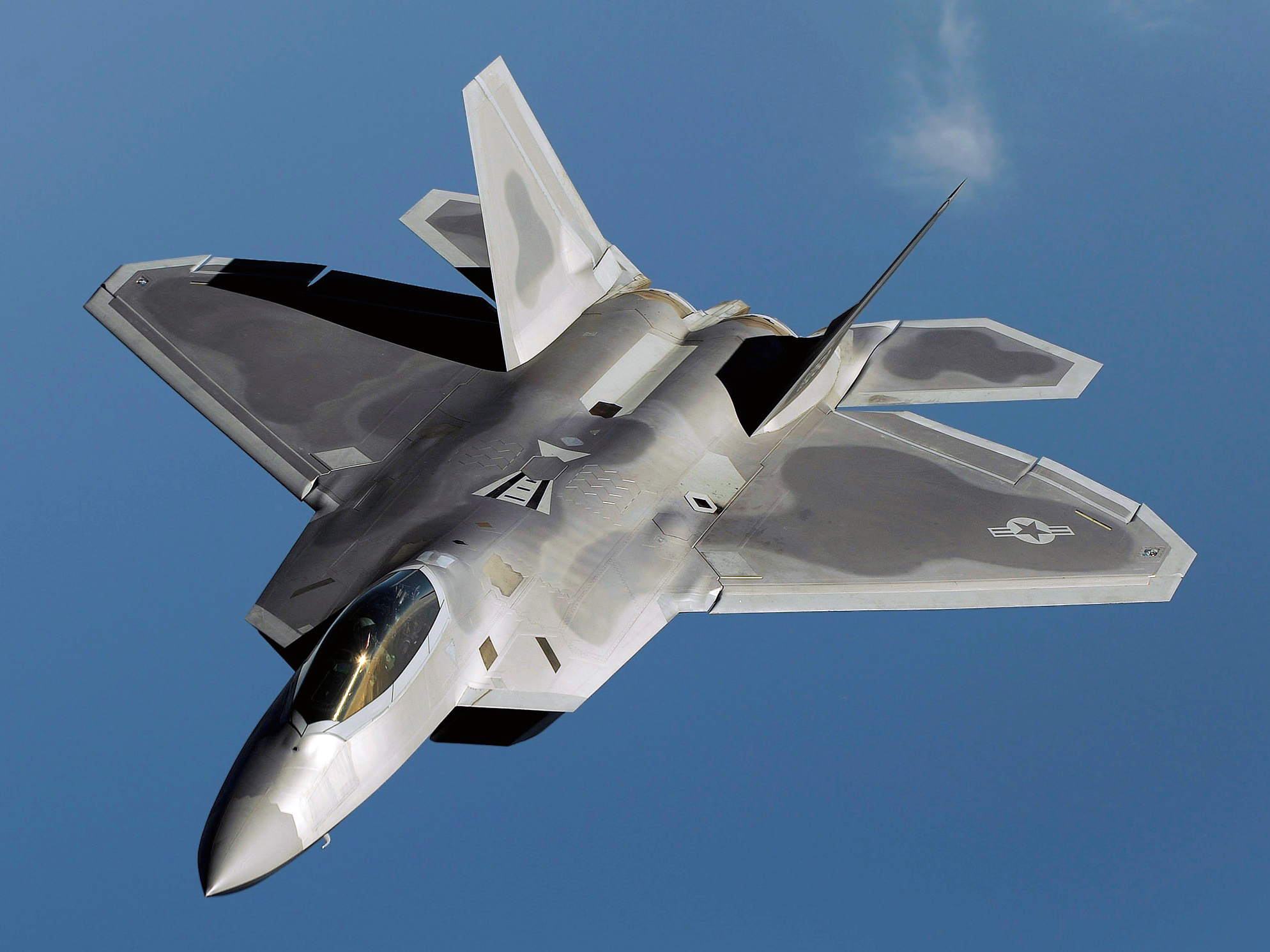
The twin tail of a Lockheed Martin F-22 Raptor fighter jet

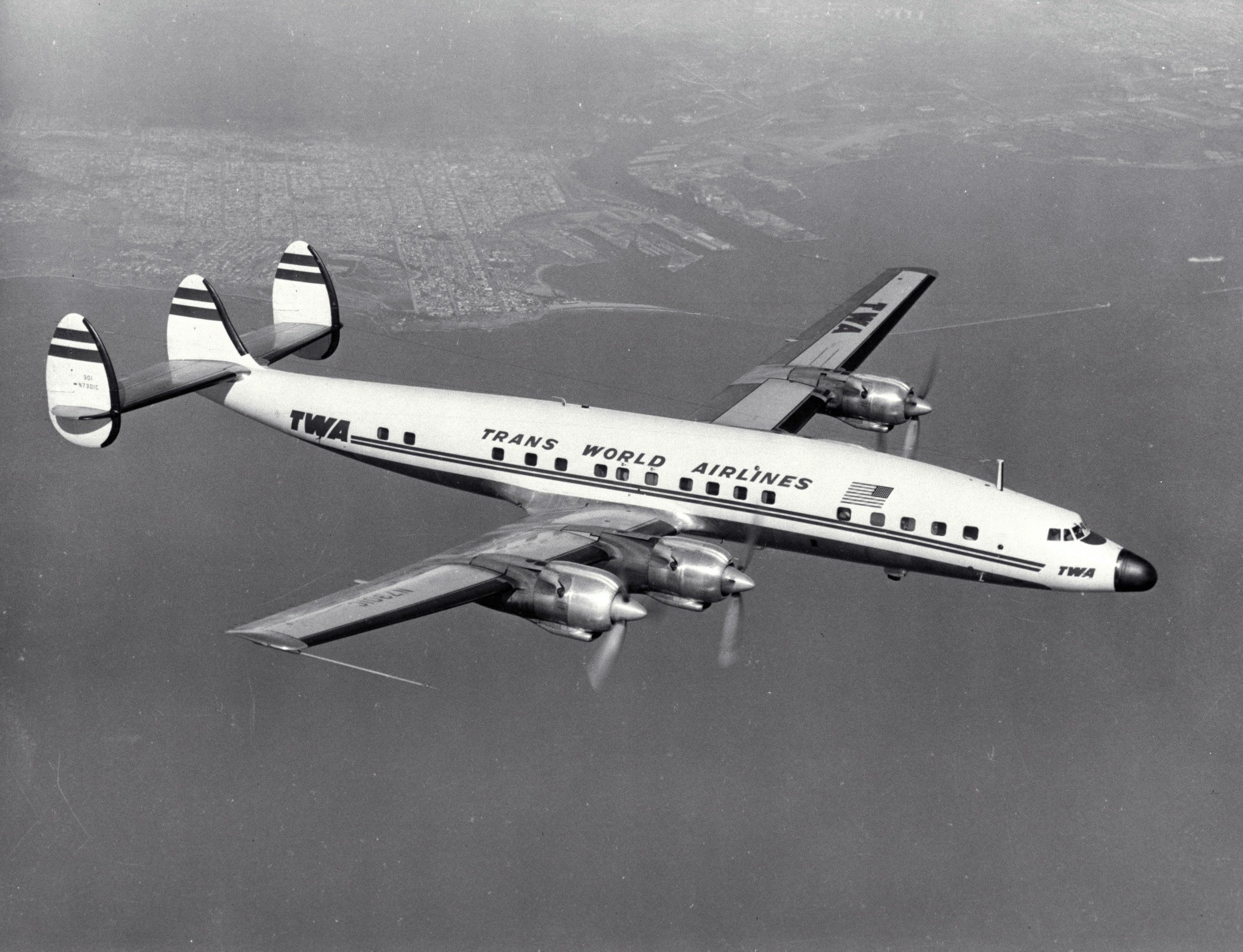
A Lockheed Constellation with a triple tail

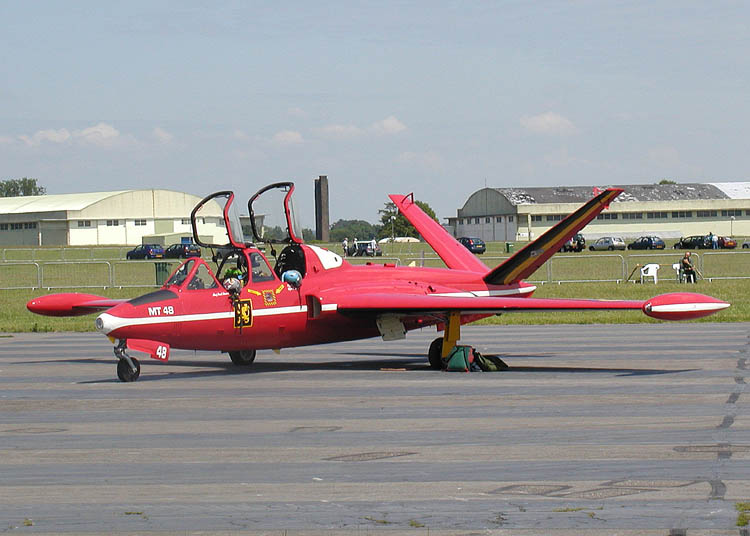
The V-tail of a Belgian Air Force Fouga CM.170 Magister

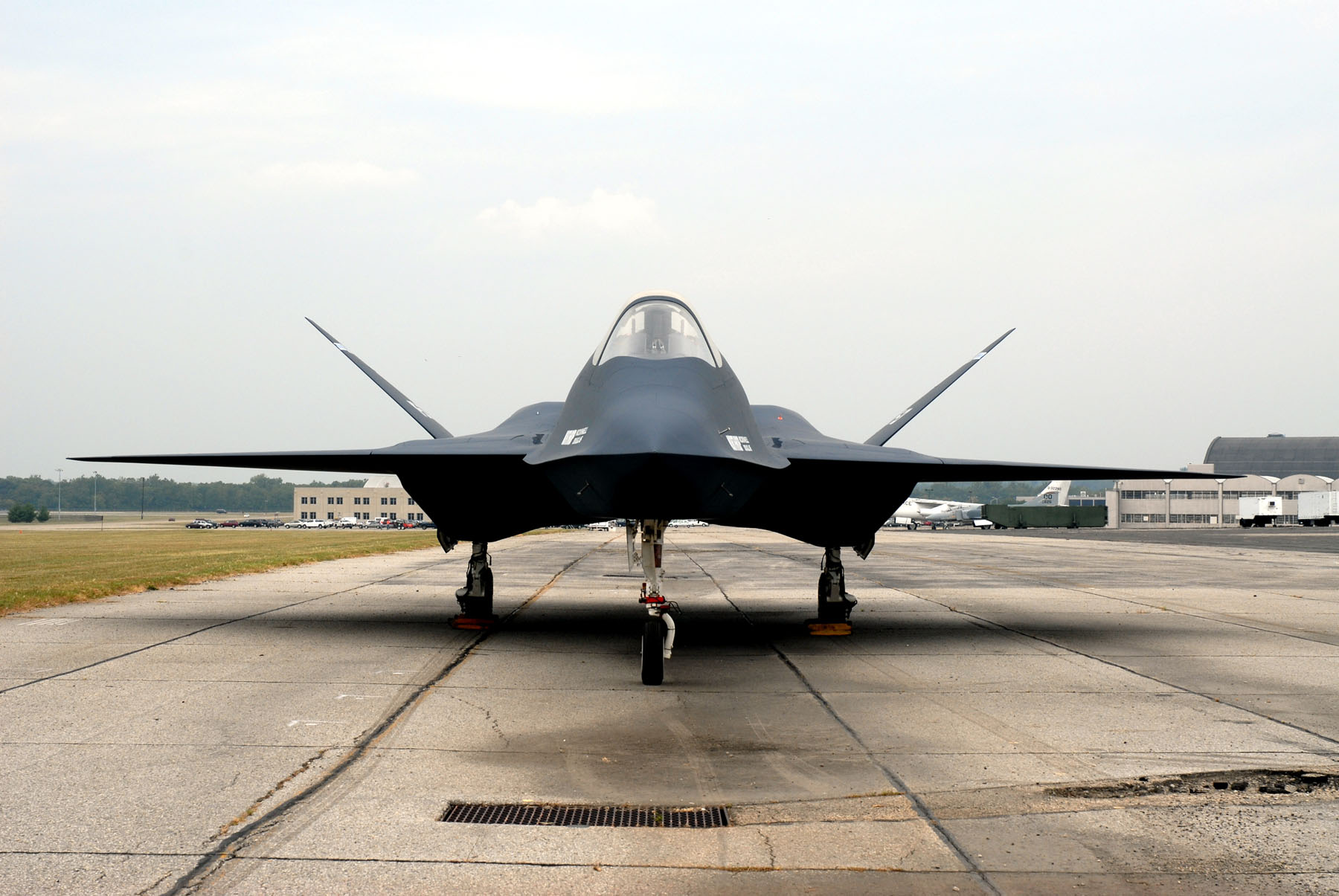
The V-tail of the YF-23

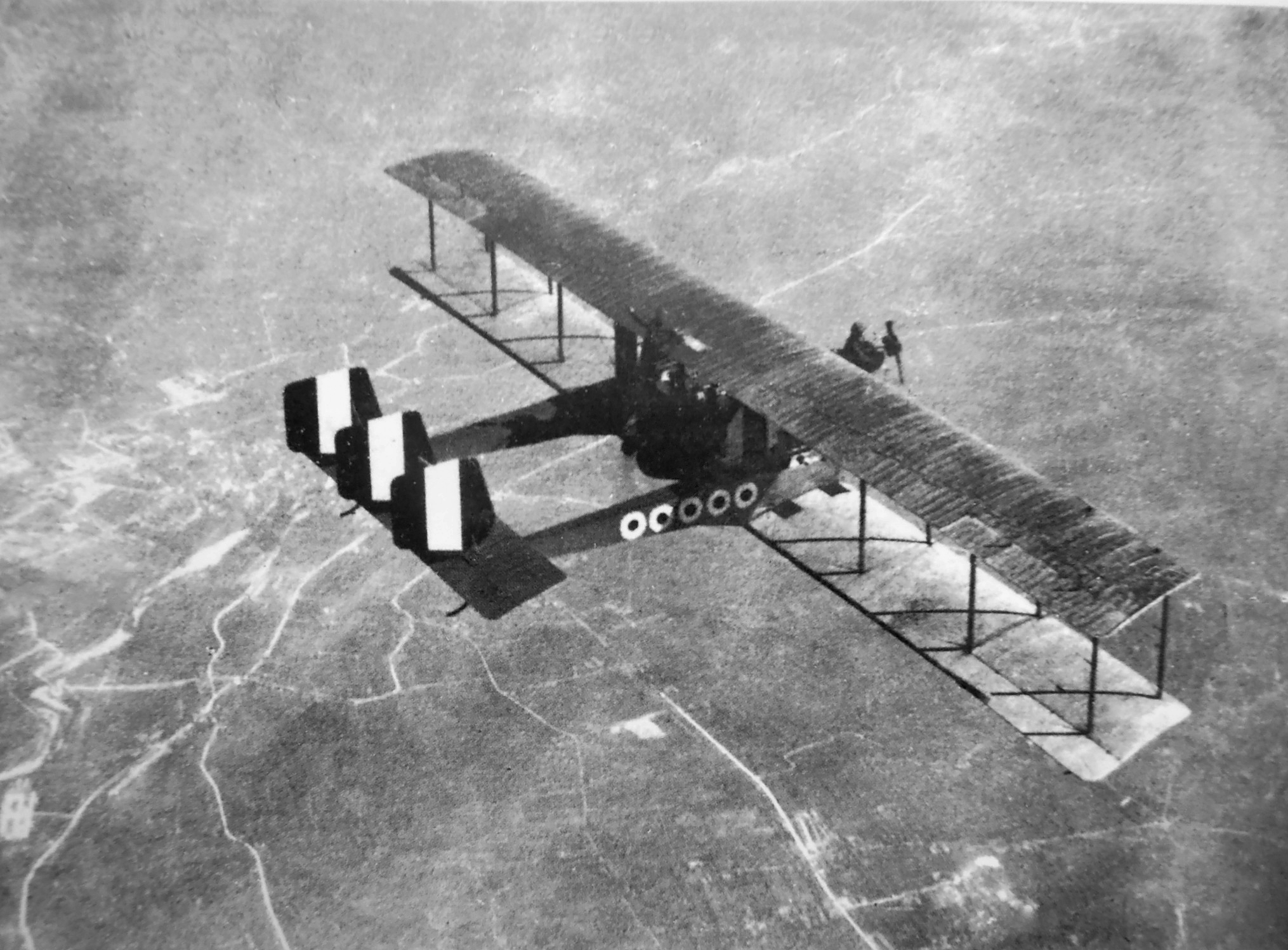
The Caproni Ca.3 was both twin boom and triple tail

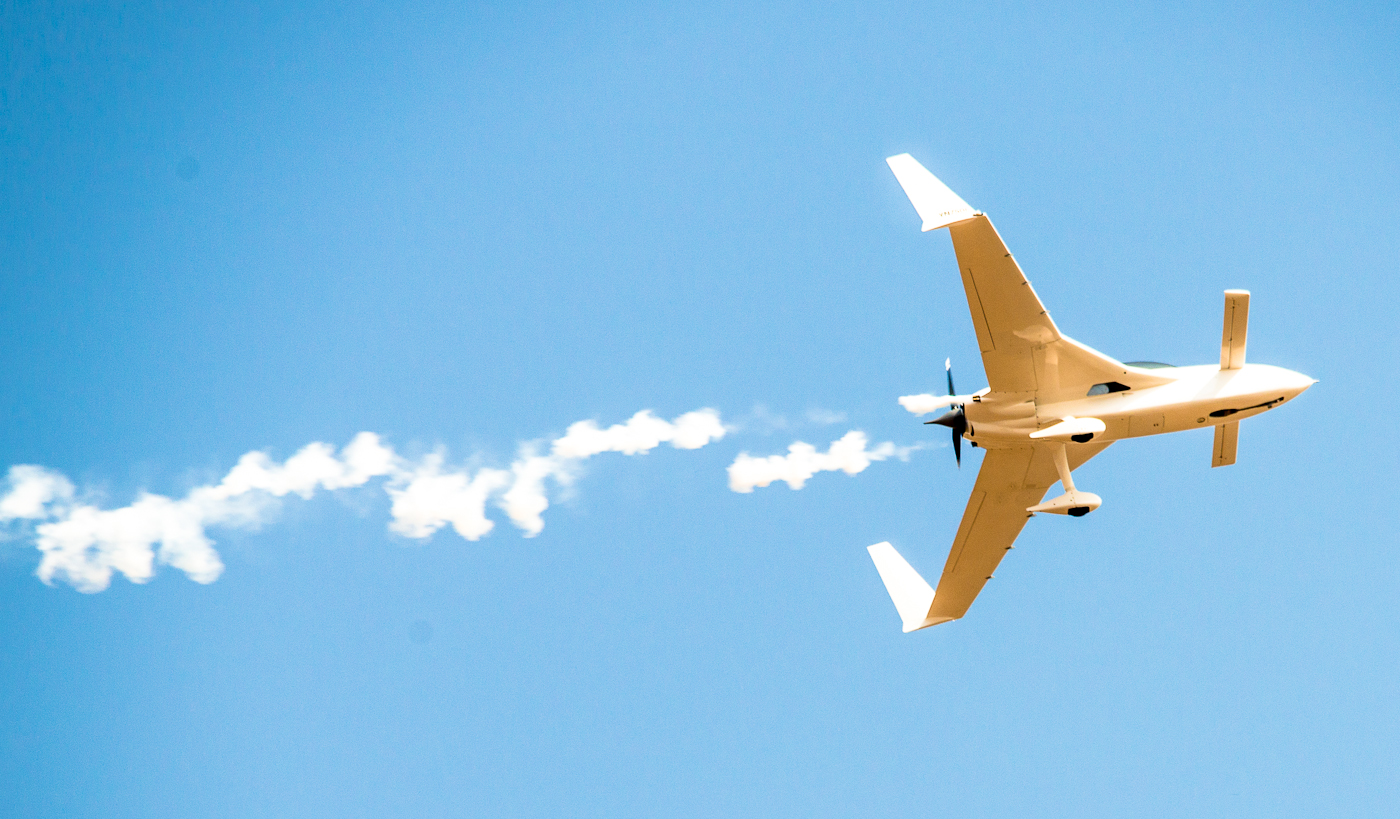
Rutan Long-EZ

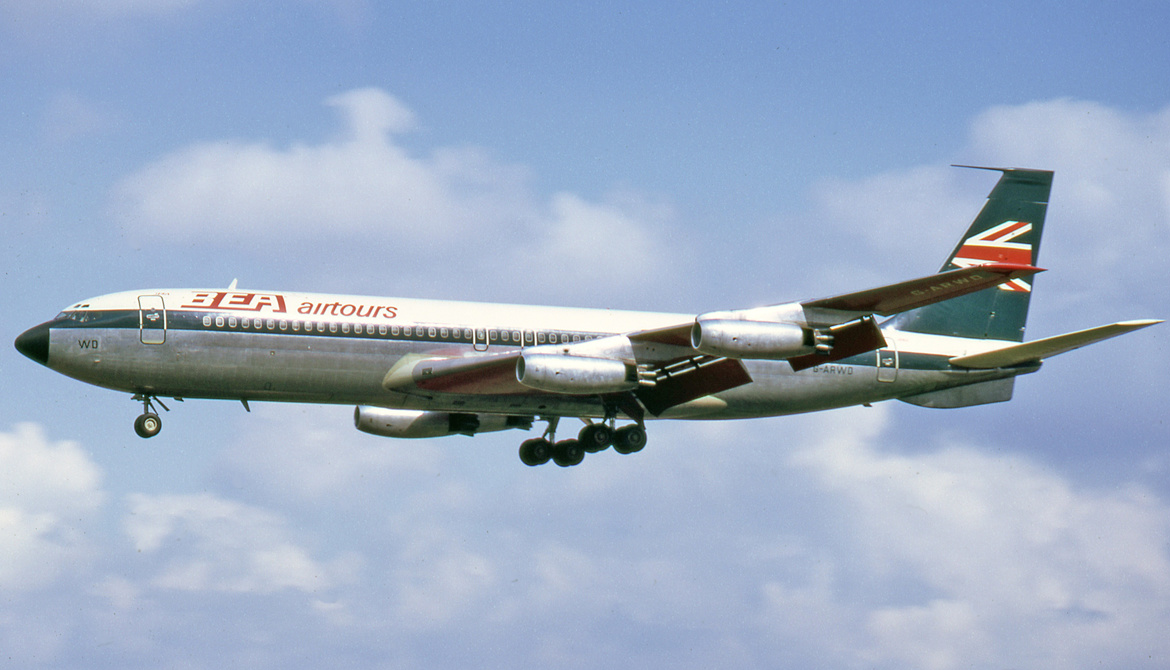
Boeing 707-420 with additional ventral tail fin

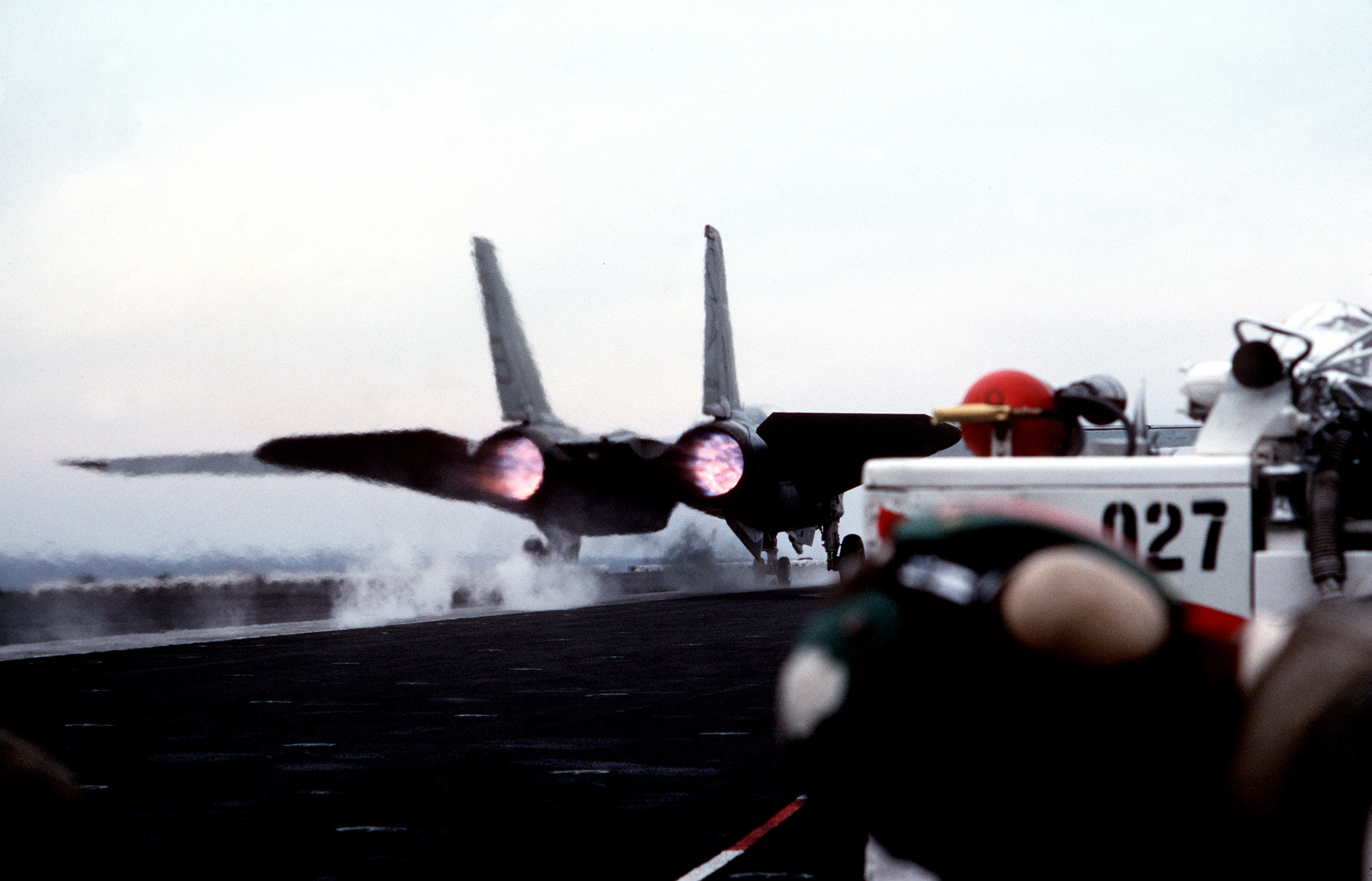
Twin tail layout of the Grumman F-14 Tomcat

=== Folding for storage ===
The top part of the vertical fin on the North American A-5 Vigilante folds to the side due to the hangar deck height restriction.

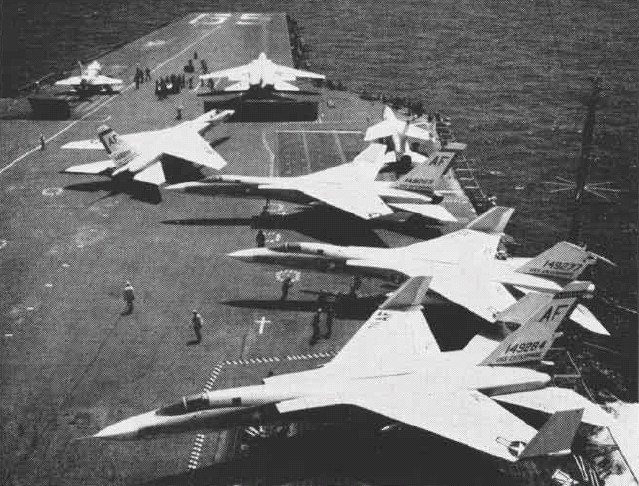
North American A-5 Vigilantes, one with folded fin

== Automotive use ==
Devices similar to vertical tails have been used on cars such as the 1955 Jaguar D-type or the 2013 Lamborghini Veneno. On race cars, its primary purpose is to reduce sudden high-speed yaw-induced blow-overs that would cause cars to flip due to lift when subject to extreme yaw angles during cornering or in a spin. Since 2011, the vertical stabilizer has become mandatory for all newly homologated Le Mans Prototypes.

Some Formula 1 teams utilized a vertical stabilizer as a way to disrupt the airflow to the rear wing reducing drag, the most radical system being the "F-duct" found in the 2010 McLaren MP4-25 and Ferrari F10. On demand by the driver, this system diverted air from a duct in the front of the car through a tunnel in the vertical fin onto the rear wing to stall it and reduce drag on the straights on which downforce was not needed. The system was banned for the 2011 Formula 1 season.

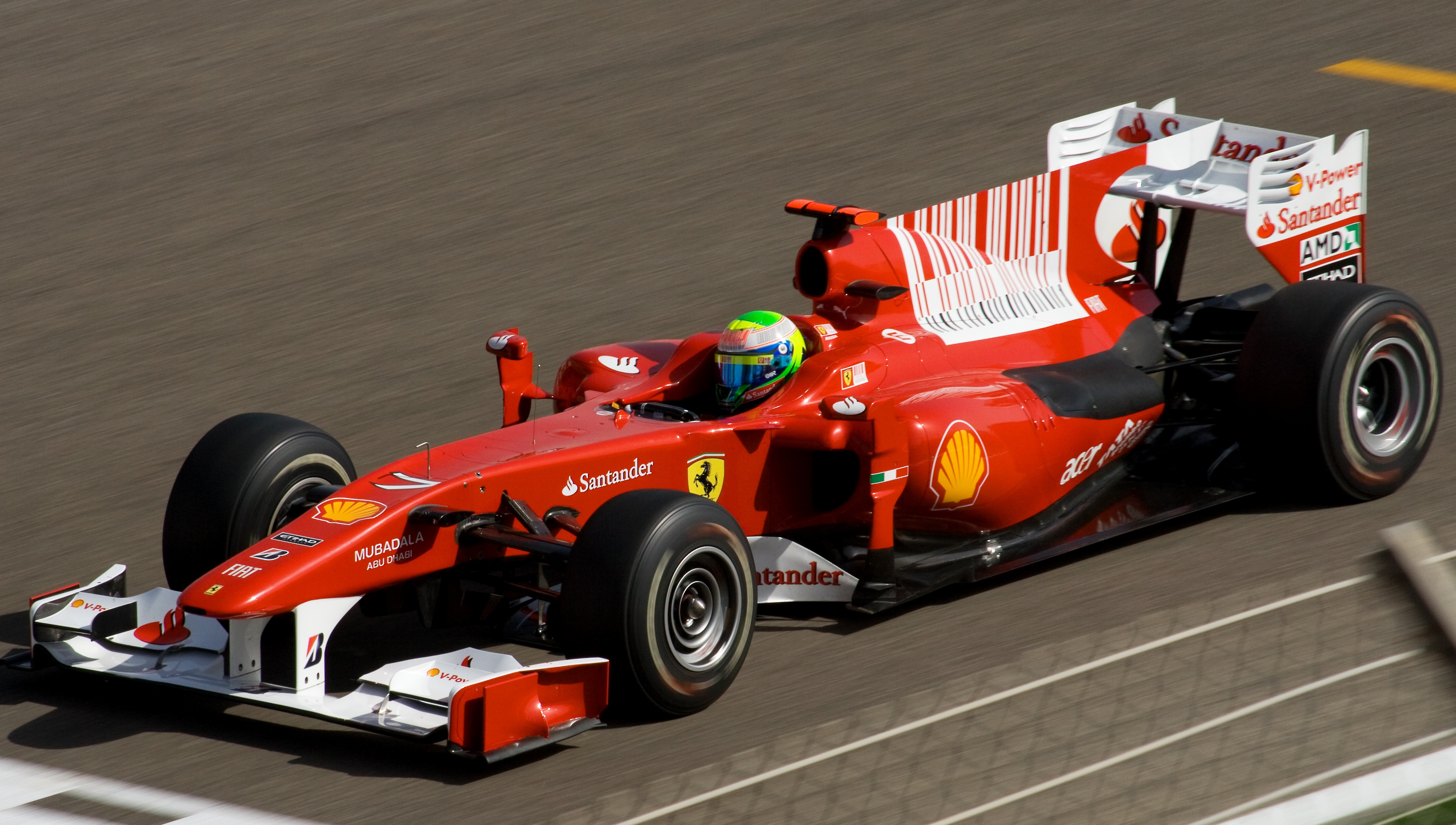
Ferrari F10 with vertical fin between air inlet and wing

== See also ==
- Japan Air Lines Flight 123, which crashed after suffering near-total loss of its vertical stabilizer
- American Airlines Flight 587, which had its vertical stabilizer torn off after harsh use during wake turbulence
- Boeing 737 rudder issues – Series of accidents and incidents involving the rudder of the Boeing 737 jamming and causing the aircraft to uncontrollably roll
