= John Kearney =

John Kearney may refer to:

- John Kearney (bishop), (c.1742–1813), Church of Ireland bishop of Ossory
- John Kearney (artist), (1924–2014), American artist, famous for making figurative sculptures, often of animals
- John Kearney (soldier), former member of Clann na Gael
