= Aidan Kearney =

Aidan Kearney may refer to:

- Aidan Kearney (hurler) (born 1984), Irish hurler
- Aidan Kearney (rugby union) (born 1979), Irish rugby union player
- Aidan Kearney (journalist) (born 1981), American journalist, blogger, and author, also known as Turtleboy

== See also ==
- Kearney (surname)
