= Rudder travel limiter =

Aircraft mechanism

A rudder travel limiter, or rudder limiter, is a controlling device in an aircraft used to mechanically limit the maximum rudder deflection.

== Background ==
An aircraft rudder is a flight control surface used to control rotation around its vertical axis, known as yaw, which is especially important during takeoff, landing, and emergency conditions. Rudders are typically found within the vertical stabilizer of the aircraft. Excessive use of rudder can exceed the ultimate load of the vertical stabilizer, causing structural failure. For this reason, modern airliners and fly-by-wire aircraft often include a system to prevent excessive rudder deflection.

The rudder travel limiter in the Airbus A300-600 is controlled by the Feel and Limitation Computers (FLC) maintaining sufficient yaw control within the entire flight envelope and limiting excessive lateral loads on the rudder and vertical stabilizer.

== Notable accidents ==
A fault with the rudder travel limiter was involved in the crash of Indonesia AirAsia Flight 8501. The design of the rudder travel limiter on the Airbus A300-600 was cited as a contributing factor to the crash of American Airlines Flight 587. In addition to a low rudder pedal sensitivity compared to other aircraft, the A300-600 had a variable stop design, contrary to earlier iterations of the A300, which used a variable ratio design.
