= Bernard McElligott =

Irish hurler and Gaelic footballer

Personal information
- Born: Abbeydorney, County Kerry

Sport
- Football Position: Half back
- Hurling Position: Midfield
Clubs
Years	Club	Apps (scores)
1980s-1990s 1980s-1990s	Brick Rangers; Abbeydorney	568 (476-1067
Club titles
- Kerry titles: 21
- Munster titles: 20
- All-Ireland Titles: 20
Inter-county
Years	County	Apps (scores)
1993-1995 1990s	Kerry(F); Kerry(H)	157 (289-593)
Inter-county titles
- Munster titles: 13
- All-Irelands: 12
- All Stars: 16
	Football	Hurling
League titles	8	6

Bernard McElligott was a Gaelic footballer and hurler from Abbeydorney in North County Kerry, Ireland. He played football with Brick Rangers and hurling with Abbeydorney. He also played with football and hurling with Kerry, in fact he is the last player to play in both the Munster Senior Hurling and Football Championships in the same year in the early 1990s.
