= Conor Kearney =

Irish hurler and Gaelic footballer

Personal information
- Born: Abbeydorney, County Kerry

Sport
- Sport: Gaelic football
- Position: Medfield
Club
- Years: Club
- 1980s-1990s 1980s-1990s 1990s 2000s: Brick Rangers Abbeydorney Laune Rangers Na Gaeil
Inter-county
Years	County	Apps (scores)
1993-1995	Kerry	4 (0-00)
Inter-county titles
- Munster titles: 0
- All-Irelands: 0
- NFL: 0

Conor Kearney was a footballer and hurler from County Kerry. He played during the 1980s and 90's

== Club ==
He played football with Brick Rangers and also played hurling with Abbeydorney. He later joined Laune Rangers with whom he won and All Ireland Club Championship in 1996. He also played with Tralee side Na Gaeil towards the end of his career.

== Underage ==
He also played with Kerry, winning a Munster Minor Football Championship in 1989 after playing in wins over Waterford and Cork. Kerry later lost to Offaly in the All-Ireland semi-final.

He later moved on to the Kerry Under 21 team. He won a Munster U21 medal in 1991 after wins over Waterford and Cork. Kerry overcame Meath in the All-Ireland final. The final was a repeat of the 1990 with Tyrone. Kerry suffered a heavy loss in the end as the Ulster side took the title.

He was underage again in 1992. He won a second Munster title after Kerry overcame Cork in the final. They suffered another heavy loss to Tyrone this time in the All-Ireland semi-final.

== Senior ==
Kearney joined the Kerry senior team during the 1992/93 National Football League, playing in four games. He later played in the Munster championship when Kerry faced Cork. He came on as a sub as Kerry summer ended at the first hurdle.
