= Michael Kearney (disambiguation) =

Michael Kearney (born 1984) is a former American child prodigy.

Michael, Mick or Mike Kearney may also refer to:

- Michael Kearney (politician) (1811–1885), Canadian politician and shipbuilder
- Michael Kearney (Medal of Honor) (1874–1937), Irish-American soldier
- Michael Kearney (priest) (1734–1814), Irish priest
- Mike Kearney (born 1953), Scottish footballer
- Michael Kearney, protagonist in the novel Light
- Mick Kearney (born 1991), Irish rugby union player
- Mikey Kearney (born 1995), Irish hurler
