= John Kearney (soldier) =

Irish Fenian

John Kearney was an Irish activist and a member of Clann na Gael, captured during what was called the Fenian dynamite campaign (1881 to 1885).

== Background ==
After the failure of the rebellion of 1867 and of the raids on Canada in 1866 and 1870, many American Fenians were disillusioned about any campaign to counter the British presence in Ireland. However, Alfred Nobel's 1866 invention of dynamite appeared to some members as the remedy for the ailing 'physical-force' movement. With combined with the new innovation of clockwork timers, members of the Irish Republican Brotherhood (IRB) and Clann na Gael started the Fenian dynamite campaign (1881–85), which sustained a campaign incorporating a series of explosions in British urban centres. Through the use of explosives and timers (modern technology at the time), the Irish question affected daily life in British cities for the first time.

== A dynamite school ==
A dynamite school in Brooklyn, America trained men in the do-it-yourself use of explosives, and then dispatched them to Britain to undertake attacks in cities there. The sophistication of their bomb design was the work of a chemicals expert who called himself Professor Mezzeroff. He was hired by Jeremiah O’Donovan Rossa to bring expertise and credibility to the United Irishmen.

By the early 1880s at least four of students of the school were in operation in Ireland, Scotland and England, the most remarkable being Timothy Featherstone, John Francis Kearney, Henry Dalton and Thomas J. Mooney. Kearney, a student of Mezzeroff, was a key element of the Jeremiah O'Donovan Rossa backed group that exploded three bombs in Glasgow in January 1883, at a gasworks, a railway station and a canal bridge. Ten men were arrested and imprisoned for their roles in the conspiracy. Kearney walked free, having turned queen's evidence after his arrest.

== See also ==
- List of Irish uprisings
- Fenian Rising
- Fenian raids
- Manchester Martyrs and Cuba Five
- S-Plan - a bombing campaign in England by the Irish Republican Army
- Physical force Irish republicanism
- Vivian Dering Majendie one of the first bomb disposal experts

== References and notes ==
- The Fenian Dynamite campaign 1881-85.
- ‘Scientific warfare or the quickest way to liberate Ireland’: the Brooklyn Dynamite School.
- The curious case of Professor Mezzeroff – IED expert, terrorism proponent and New York liquor salesman.
