= International Review of Financial Analysis =

Academic journal in the field of finance

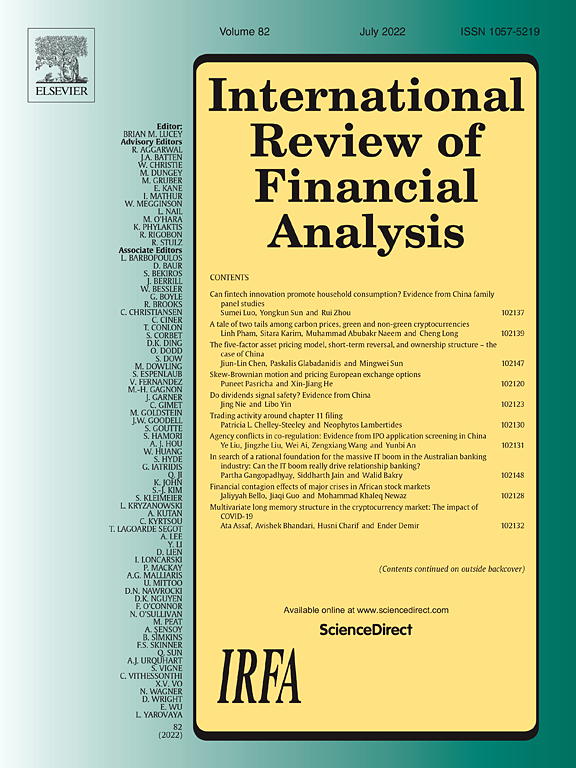
- Discipline: Finance
- Language: English
- Edited by: Antoinette Schoar

Publication details
- History: 1992–present
- Publisher: Elsevier
- Frequency: Bimonthly
- Impact factor: 9.8 (2024)

Standard abbreviations
- ISO 4: Int. Rev. Financ. Anal.

Indexing
- ISSN: 1057-5219 (print); 1873-8079 (web)

Links
- Journal homepage; Online archive

The International Review of Financial Analysis is a bimonthly peer-reviewed academic journal in the field of finance. It is one of the leading academic finance journals, being ranked as an "ABS3" journal by the Chartered Association of Business Schools. It was established by George Frankfurter and George Philipattos in 1992 and published, originally, by JAI Press, Connecticut. Currently it is published by Elsevier. According to the Journal Citation Reports, the journal has a 2024 impact factor of 9.8.
