= David Kearney =

David Kearney may refer to:

- David Kearney (archbishop) (died 1624), Irish Roman Catholic prelate
- Dave Kearney (born 1989), Irish rugby union player
- David Kearney (Shortland Street), a fictional character on the New Zealand soap opera Shortland Street
- David William Kearney, better known as Guitar Shorty (born 1939), American blues guitarist
