= Colm Kearney =

Irish economist and academic (1954–2018)

Colm Kearney (1954–2018) was an Irish economist and academic, who was dean of the Faculty of Business and Economics at Monash University, Melbourne, Australia, until 2017, shortly before his death on 28 March 2018.

== Background ==
Born and raised in Dublin, Kearney attended University College Dublin (UCD), where he graduated with a BA in Economics and Politics. Kearney went on to complete master's degrees in economics from UCD, the University of Essex, and The University of Western Ontario. In 1985 he completed his PhD at the University of Warwick. His doctoral thesis was entitled "Monetary Policy and Asset Prices".

== Academic career and interests ==
Kearney's lecturing career began at the University of Essex, after which he worked as a research associate in the Institute for Employment Research at the University of Warwick while completing his doctoral research. He joined the Economics Department at the University of New South Wales, becoming a senior lecturer in 1988. His first professorial chair was obtained in 1990 in the Department of Economics and Finance at University of Western Sydney. After serving as an economic advisor to the Australian government he took up the position of professor of finance and economics at the University of Technology, Sydney, and continued with his research supported by a number of Australian Research Council awards.

From 2001 to 2011, Kearney served as professor of international business at Trinity College. He was elected dean of the Faculty of Business Economic and Social Studies in 2004. In 2005, Kearney was appointed to serve as senior lecturer (now chief academic officer) of the college. From 2012 to 2017, Kearney was dean of the Faculty of Business and Economics at Monash University in Melbourne.

== Personal ==
Kearney had broad policy and consulting experience, serving as senior economic advisor to Australian Federal Treasurer (Ministers for Finance) John Kerin and Federal Finance Minister Ralph Willis in the early 1990s. His role involved attending Cabinet meetings and parliamentary sessions, advising the treasurer as well as other cabinet ministers on all aspects of macroeconomic and financial policy.

Kearney is best known for his work in international business and finance. He studied and worked in ten universities in Australia, Canada, Ireland and the UK. He won competitive research awards in both Australia and Ireland, including an IRCHSS Senior Research Fellowship. He jointly led a successful bid to Enterprise Ireland under its High Performance Start-Up programme for a campus company. He also successfully attracted significant philanthropic funds.

== Publications ==
=== Books ===
- Gurdgiev, C., S. Jackson and C. Kearney (eds) (2008) Perspectives on International Debt, Liffey Press, Dublin, 197 pages, ISBN 978-1-905785-24-7.
- Batten, J.A. and C. Kearney (eds) (2006) Emerging European Financial Markets: Independence and Integration Post-Enlargement, International Finance Review Volume 6, Elsevier, 524 pages, ISBN 0-7623-1264-5.
- Dornbusch, R., S. Fischer and C. Kearney (1995) Macroeconomics, McGraw Hill, Sydney. Reprinted 1996, 339 pages, ISBN 0-07-470035-9.
- Kearney, C. and R. MacDonald (eds) (1991) Developments in Australian Monetary Economics, Longman Cheshire Press, Melbourne. 251 pages, ISBN 0-582-71263-7.

=== Book chapters ===
- Berrill, J. and C. Kearney (2010). Investing in emerging and developing markets. In H. Kent Baker and Leigh A. Riddick (editors), Survey of International Finance, Oxford University Press, (forthcoming).
- Carroll, R. and C. Kearney (2009) 'GARCH modelling of equity market volatility', in G. Gregariou (ed), Stock Market Volatility, Chapman Hall/Taylor and Francis, London.
- Batten, J.A. and C. Kearney (2006) 'Interdependence and Integration in Emerging European Equity Markets', Chapter 1 in Batten, J.A. and C. Kearney (eds) Emerging European Financial Markets: Independence and Integration Post-Enlargement, International Finance Review, Volume 6, 1–10, Elsevier.
- Kearney, C. and C. Muckley (2005) 'The Role of the Japanese Yen in Asian Exchange Rate Determination', in T.A. Fetherston and J.A. Batten (eds), Asia Pacific Financial Markets in Comparative Perspective: Issues and Implications for the 21st Century, Contemporary Studies in Economics and Financial Analysis, Volume 86, 29–51, Elsevier.
- Hutson, E. and C. Kearney (2001) 'The IMF and the New International Financial Architecture', in A. Chowdhury (ed), Beyond the East Asian Crisis, Edward Elgar.
- Batten, J. and C. Kearney (1999) 'A Brave New World? – Financial Deregulation in Australia', Chapter 8 in M. Carmen and I. Rogers (eds), Out of the Rut: Making Labor a Genuine Alternative, Allen and Unwin, 209–236.
- Kearney, C. (1997) 'International Finance and Exchange Rate Policy', Chapter 5 in P. Kriesler (ed), The Australian Economy, Allen and Unwin, 75–95.
- Kearney, C. (1996) 'Volatility and Risk in Integrated Financial Systems: Definition, Measurement and Policy Implications', Chapter 6 in F. Bruni, D. Fair and R. O'Brien (eds), Risk Management in Volatile Financial Markets, Kluwer Academic Press.
- Kearney, C. (1995) 'The Balance of Payments and Australia's External Constraint', Chapter 5 in P. Kriesler (ed), The Australian Economy, Allen and Unwin.
- Kearney, C, K. Chowdhury and L. Fallick. (1994) 'Public Infrastructure and Private Investment in Australia', Chapter 8 in M. Johnson, P. Kriesler and T. Owen (eds), Current Issues in Australian Economics, Allen and Unwin.
- Kearney, C. (1993) 'Australia's External Constraint', Chapter 2 in G. Mahony (ed), The Australian Economy under Labor, Allen and Unwin.
- Kearney, C. (1993) 'Parity Conditions and Asset Market Models of Exchange Rate Determination', Chapter 4 in J. Batten (ed), Finance Theory and Policy, Butterworth Press.
- Kearney, C, and K. Daly (1993) 'Water in Australia: Capital Structure and Financing Strategies', Chapter 4 in M. Johnson and S. Rix (eds), Water in Australia, Pluto Press.
- Kearney, C. and R. MacDonald (1991) 'The Efficiency of the Australian Foreign Exchange Market: A Five Currency Test Using Daily Data', in C. Kearney and R. MacDonald (eds), Developments in Australian Monetary Economics, Longman Cheshire Press.
- Kearney, C. and J. Hillier (1991) 'The Success and Failure of Australian Financial Futures Markets', in C. Kearney and R. MacDonald (eds), Developments in Australian Monetary Economics, Longman Cheshire Press.
- Kearney, C. (1991) 'Financing Electricity Infrastructure', Chapter 4 in M. Johnson and S. Rix (eds), Powering the Future, Pluto Press.
- Kearney, C. (1990) 'Stabilisation Policy with Flexible Exchange Rates', Chapter 5 in D. T. Llewellyn and C.R. Milner (eds), Current Issues in International Monetary Economics, Macmillan Press.
- Kearney, C. (1985) 'Money and Monetary Control', Chapter 3 in B. Atkinson (ed), Developments in Economics, Causeway Press.

=== Journal articles ===
- Aggarwal, R., J. Berrill, E. Hutson and C. Kearney (2011), 'What is a multinational corporation? Classifying the degree of firm-level multinationality', in International Business Review, (forthcoming).
- Berril, J. and C. Kearney (2010), 'International diversification and the home bias puzzle', Journal of Economics and business, 62(4): 235–256.
- Hutson, E., C. Kearney and M. Lynch (2008), Volume and skewness in international equity markets, Journal of Banking and Finance, 32(7), 1255–1268.
- Kearney, C. and V. Poti (2007) Have European Stocks Become More Volatile? An Empirical Investigation of Idiosyncratic and Market Risk in the Euro Area, European Financial Management 14 (3), 419–444.
- Kearney, C. and C. Muckley (2007) Is North and Southeast Asia becoming a Yen Block?, International Journal of Finance and Economics 12:3, 337 – 351.
- Kearney, C. and C. Muckley (2007) 'Reassessing the Evidence of an Emerging Yen Block in Southeast Asia', International Review of Economics and Finance 16, 255–271.
- Kearney, C. and C. Muckley (2007) Can the traditional Asian US dollar peg exchange rate regime be extended to include the Japanese yen?, International Review of Financial Analysis, 16, 1 – 16.
- Kearney, C. and M. Lynch (2007) Are International Equity Markets Really Asymmetric?, Applied Financial Economics 17(5), 399–411.
- Barry, F. and C. Kearney (2006) MNEs and Industrial Structure in Host Countries: A Portfolio Analysis of Irish Manufacturing, Journal of International Business Studies 37(3), 392–406.
- Kearney, C. and V. Poti (2006) Correlation Dynamics in European Equity Markets, Research in International Business and Finance 20(3), 305–321.
- Brady, M. and C. Kearney (eds) (2005) Proceedings of the 2004 IAM Conference, Irish Journal of Management, Special Issue, 26(1).
- Hutson, E. and C. Kearney (2005) Merger Arbitrage and the Interaction between Target and Bidder Stocks during Takeover Bids, Research in International Business and Finance 19, 1–26.
- Kearney, C. and B. Lucey (eds) (2004) 'International Equity Market Integration', Special Issue, International Review of Financial Analysis 13(5).
- Kearney, C. and B. Lucey (2004) Equity Market Integration – An Overview, International Review of Financial Analysis 13(5), 571–583.
- Barry, F., A. Hannan, E. Hutson and C. Kearney (2003) 'Competitiveness Implications for Ireland of EU Enlargement', Journal of the Statistical and Social Inquiry Society of Ireland 32, 70–97.
- Hutson, E. and C. Kearney (2001) 'Volatility in Stocks subject to Takeover Bids: Australian Evidence using Daily Data', Journal of Empirical Finance 8, 273–296.
- Kearney, C. and A. Patton (2000) 'Multivariate GARCH Modelling of Exchange Rate Volatility Transmission in the EMS', The Financial Review 41, 29–48.
- Kearney, C. (2000), 'The Determination and International Transmission of Stock Market Volatility', Global Finance Journal 11, 1–22.
- Hutson, E. and C. Kearney (2000) 'The Asian Financial Crisis and the Balance of Payments', in P. Kriesler (ed), The Australian Economy, Allen and Unwin.
- Hutson, E. and C. Kearney (1999) 'The Asian Financial Crisis and the IMF: A Survey', Journal of the Asia Pacific Economy 4, 393–412.
- Kearney, C. (1999) 'The Asian Financial Crisis', Quarterly Economic Commentary, Economic and Social Research Institute, Dublin, February 29–56.
- Kearney, C. (1999) 'The Dangers of Deflation', The Sydney Papers, 11(3), 104–111.
- Kearney, C. (1998) 'The Causes of Volatility in a Small Internationally Integrated Stock Market: Ireland July 1975 – June 1994', The Journal of Financial Research 21, 85–104.
- Kearney, C. and K. Daly (1998) 'The Causes of Stock Market Volatility in Australia', Applied Financial Economics 8, 597–605.
- Daly, K. and C. Kearney (1998) 'Fiscal Financing Decisions and the Exchange Rate', Journal of Economic Studies 24(4), 309–327.
- Batten, J. and C. Kearney (1998) 'Legislating Financial Reform: The Australian Experience', Australian Journal of Corporate Law 8, 300–320.
- Kearney, C. and I. Saleh (1998) 'Project Evaluation by Australian Government Agencies and Business Enterprises', Journal of Accounting, Accountability and Performance 4(1), 101–117.
- Kearney, C. and K. Daly (1997) 'Monetary Volatility and the Volatility of Money Output: An Empirical Model of the Transmission Mechanism; Australia, January 1973 – July 1994', International Review of Financial Analysis 6(2), 77–95.
- Chowdhury, K., C. Kearney and S. Paul (1997) 'The Relationship between Inflation and Economic Growth: A Multi-Country Empirical Analysis', Applied Economics 29, 1387–1401.
- Kearney, C. and M. Sadeghi (1997) 'The Short Term Price Performance of Initial Public Offerings of Common Stock: Australia 1991–1994', International Journal of Business Studies (5), 1–10.
- Clyman, D. and C. Kearney (1997) 'Volume and Liquidity in Financial Futures Markets: The FINEX Experience in Dublin's IFSC', Irish Banking Review, Winter, 41–55.
- Kearney, C. (1997) 'The Wallis Inquiry and the Australian Financial Deregulatory Experience', Economic and Labour Relations Review 8, 308–317.
- Kearney, C. (1996) 'International Financial Integration: Definition, Measurement and Policy Implications', Journal of the Asia Pacific Economy 1, 347–364.
- Kearney, C. (1996) 'Wage Bargaining and the Efficiency Dividend in Public Enterprises', Economic and Labour Relations Review 7, 213–223.
- Kearney, C. (1996) 'Volatility and Seasonality in the Irish Stock Market', Irish Banking Review, June, 27–44.
- Favotto, I, P. Kriesler, C. Kearney and T. Stegman (1994) 'Network Pricing versus Location Specific Pricing of Aeronautical Services in the Australian Aviation Industry', Economic Papers 13, 38–52.
- F. Favotto and C. Kearney (1994) 'Regulating Natural Monopoly: Are Price Caps an Alternative to Rate of Return Targets?', Economic and Labour Relations Review 5, 1–20.
- Kearney, C., K. Daly and F. Evangilistas (1993) 'Exporting Manufactures from Western Sydney', Economic Papers 12, 3–20.
- Kearney, C. and M. Monadjemi (1991) 'The Interest Rate Neutrality of Fiscal Deficits: Testing for Ricardian Equivalence and Capital Inflow', Journal of International Money and Finance 10, 541–551.
- Kearney, C. and R. MacDonald (1991) 'Efficiency, News and Risk in the Forward Foreign Exchange Market: Weekly Tests of the Australian/US Dollar Exchange Rate, January 1984 – March 1987', Economic Record 67, 237–243.
- Kearney, C. and M. Monadjemi (1990) 'Fiscal Policy and Current Account Performance: International Evidence on the Twin Deficits', Journal of Macroeconomics 12, 197–219.
- Kearney, C. and R. MacDonald (1990) 'Consumption, Co integration and Rational Expectations: Some Australian Evidence', Australian Economic Papers, June, 40–52.
- Kearney, C. and R. MacDonald (1990) 'Rational Expectations and the Monetary Approach to Exchange Rate Determination: A Monthly Model of the Australian/US Dollar Exchange Rate', Australian Economic Papers, June, 1–20.
- Kearney, C. and M. Monadjemi (1990) 'Deregulation and Monetary Policy', Economic and Labour Relations Review 1, 18–33.
- Kearney, C., R. MacDonald and J. Hillier (1989) 'The Efficiency of the Market for Bank Accepted Bills', Economic Record 65, 225–233.
- Kearney, C. and Y. Tong (1989) 'Chinese Foreign Trade: A Descriptive and Econometric Analysis', Economic Papers 8, 58–66.
- Bewley, R. and C. Kearney (1989) 'A Systems Approach to Modelling the EMS Exchange Rate Mechanism', Economic and Social Review (special issue on the European Monetary System) 20, 111–120.
- Kearney, C. and R. MacDonald (1988) 'Asset Markets, the Current Account and Exchange Rate Determination: An Empirical Analysis of the Sterling/Dollar Exchange Rate 1973–1983', Australian Economic Papers, December, 213–232.
- Kearney, C. (1988) 'Exchange Rate Dynamics and the Term Structure of Interest Rates', Economic and Social Review 19, 48–62.
- Kearney, C. and R. MacDonald (1987) 'The Specification of Granger Causality Tests using the Co integration Methodology', Economics Letters 25, 149–153.
- Kearney, C. (1987) 'Fiscal Policy and the Balance of Payments: A Review', Journal of Australian Political Economy 22, 27–38.
- Kearney, C. and L. Fallick (1987) 'Macroeconomic Policy and the Balance of Payments in Australia', Economic Analysis and Policy 17, 131–148.
- Kearney, C. and R. MacDonald (1986) 'Intervention and Sterilisation under Floating Exchange Rates: The UK 1973–83', European Economic Review 30, 345–364.
- Kearney, C. and R. MacDonald (1986) 'A Structural Portfolio Balance Model of the Sterling-Dollar Exchange Rate', Weltwirtschaftliches Archiv 122, 478–496.
- Kearney, C. and R. MacDonald (1985) 'Public Sector Borrowing, the Money Supply and Interest Rates', Oxford Bulletin of Economics and Statistics 47, 249–273.
- Kearney, C. and R. MacDonald (1985) 'Asset Markets and the Exchange Rate: A Structural Model of the Sterling-Dollar Rate 1972–1982', Journal of Economic Studies 12, 3–10.
- Kearney, C. (1985) 'The Demand for Money and the Term Structure of Interest Rates: Ireland 1971–81', Economic and Social Review 16, 157–166.
- Kearney, C. and D.T. Llewellyn (1984) 'The British Monetarist Experiment: A Preliminary Assessment', Economics 20, 15–22.
- Kearney, C. (1983) 'Money and Monetarism: the British Experience', Irish Banking Review, December, 27–35.

=== Other publications ===
- Kearney, C. (ed.) (1999), Budget Perspectives, Economic and Social Research Institute, Dublin. 82 pages. ISBN 0-7070-0183-8.
- Kearney, C. (1991) 'Performance Measurement in the Australian Public Service'. In J. Niland, W. Brown and B. Hughes (eds), Breaking New Ground: Enterprise Bargaining and Agency Agreements for the Australian Public Service, Australian Government Publishing Service, Canberra.
- Kearney, C. (1991) 'International Capital Flows and Macroeconomic Equilibrium with Flexible Exchange Rates', in Economic Planning Advisory Council (ed), International Capital Flows, Australian Government Publishing Service, Canberra.
- Kearney, C. (1991) 'Australia's Economic Problem: Too Few Exports', Federal Parliamentary Inquiry into Australia's Trading Situation, Submissions and Incorporated Documents, Vol 8, Australian Government Publishing Service, Canberra.
- Evatt Research Centre (1988) The Capital Funding of Public Enterprise in Australia, (joint authored), Evatt Foundation, Sydney.
- Kearney, C. (1984) 'The British Anti-Inflation Strategy: Implementing Monetarism or Turning to Radcliffe?', Societe Universitaire Europenne de Recherches Financieres, SUERF Series 44A.
