= Dyre Kearney =

American politician (1722–1791)

Dyre Kearney (born ~1722, died November 1, 1791) was an American lawyer from Dover, Delaware. He served as a delegate for Delaware to the Continental Congress in 1787 and 1788.

Very little is known about Kearney. He was born in Kent County, Delaware, around 1722. His exact date of birth is not known. He was admitted to the bar of New Castle County in 1784, and practiced law in Dover until his death there in 1791.

According to a genealogy site, he was the son of Edward Kearney and Rebecca Dyre (or Dyer)(d. abt. 1795). The same site notes that Rebecca was a great granddaughter of the Quaker martyr Mary Dyer.
