= Tom Kearney =

Tom Kearney may refer to:

- Tom Kearney (fencer) (1923–?), Irish Olympic fencer
- Tom Kearney (footballer) (born 1981), English footballer
- Thomas Henry Kearney (1874–1956), American botanist
- Andrew Thomas Kearney (1892–1962), American management consultant

== See also ==
- Tom Cairney (born 1991), footballer
