= James Kearney =

James or Jim Kearney may refer to:

- James Kearney (politician), member of the Ireland parliament for Kinsale, 1768–1790
- James Kearney (1784–1862), Topographical Engineer with the U.S. Army Corps of Engineers, and co-wrote a report "Upon an Examination of the Chesapeake and Ohio Canal from Washington, D.C. to the 'Point of Rocks", 1831.
- James E. Kearney (1884–1977), bishop of the Roman Catholic Diocese of Rochester
- Jim Kearney (American football) (born 1943), former American football safety
- Jim Kearney (Australian footballer) (1894–1944), Australian rules football player
- Jim Kearney (rugby union) (1920–1998), New Zealand international rugby union player
