= Jonathan Kearney =

English artist

Jonathan Kearney (born 1971) is an English artist. Kearney was born in Liverpool and first studied art in the city before completing an MA at Camberwell College of Arts, London.

His art usually involves pouring PVA glue and acrylic paint over a variety of surfaces. Installations, canvases and video based work are the result, sometimes with all three combined in one exhibition. Kearney has had many solo and group shows, including ICA (2003), London Art Fair (2004) and Bonham's Exhibit 06 (2006). In 2004, he moved to China to continue his art and explore links between his own practice and Chinese art. During this period, Kearney held exhibitions in the famous 798 Art Zone of Beijing and in Shanghai, including the 6th Shanghai Biennale, where he was part of the first-ever Liverpool Biennial exhibition at the Shanghai Biennale.

In 2004, Kearney also started work as an associate lecturer, teaching art on an MA (master's) course at the University of the Arts, London. This weekly work was conducted from China using a computer and the university's online learning environment. Kearney was the first and so far only associate lecturer at the University of the Arts, London, who didn't live in Britain. His first students to do so, graduated in July 2006.

Kearney was part of the innovative art group 'explosure' from 1995 to 1998; he was co-director of the artist run House Gallery from 2000 to 2006; and was director of Camberwell Arts in 2002. In 2001, he curated Sir Terry Frost's only solo show in Camberwell where Frost originally studied art after the Second World War. From 2005 to 2007, Kearny was gallery director and curator of TC/G Nordica, a large art gallery in Kunming, Yunnan, China. Kearney regularly lectures in China, including at the Central Academy of Fine Arts, Beijing.
