= Brick Rangers GAA =

Gaelic games club in County Kerry, Ireland

Brick Rangers
- Founded: 1979
- County: Kerry
- Colours: Yellow and Blue
- Grounds: Abbeydorney
- Coordinates: 52°20′55.49″N 9°41′28.74″W

Playing kits
Standard colours

Brick Rangers GAA is a former Gaelic football team from the Abbeydorney area of North County Kerry in Ireland.

== History ==
The club was formed in 1979 and folded in 1994.

In the 1992 / 93 NFL season, they played Ballyheigue in the quarter final of the St Brendans Championship (with their four Kerry Seniors in tow) and were beaten.
