= Carnival (disambiguation) =

Carnival is a festive season occurring immediately before Lent.

Carnival, carnaval or The Carnival may also refer to:

== Festivals and entertainment ==
- Brazilian Carnival, the widely-known celebration of Carnival in Brazil
- Caribbean Carnival, carnivals with origins in Caribbean culture that occur across the World
- Traveling carnival, an amusement show typically including rides, games, etc.
- West Country Carnival, parades held in the West of England between late August and late November

== Transport ==
- Carnival Cruise Line
  - Carnival Corporation & plc, the parent company of Carnival Cruise Line
- Kia Carnival, a minivan
- SS Carnivale, a steamship operating 1975–1993

== Literature ==
- Carnival (Mackenzie novel), a 1912 novel by Compton Mackenzie
- Carnival (Antoni novel), a 2005 novel by Robert Antoni
- Carnival (Bear novel), a 2006 science fiction novel by Elizabeth Bear
- "The Carnival" (short story), a 1980 short story by Michael Fedo
- "Carnival! Carnival!", a poem by Patti Smith in her 1978 book Babel

== Film and television ==
=== Film ===
- The Carnival (film), a 1911 short film
- Carnival (1921 film), a British silent drama
- Carnival (1931 film), a British drama
- Carnival (1935 film), an American film
- Carnival (1946 film), a British drama
- Carnival (1953 film), a French comedy film
- Carnival (1981 film), a Russian romantic comedy
- Carnaval (2021 film), a Brazilian comedy film
- Carnaval (2024 film), a Peruvian documentary film
- Carnival: At the End of Days, an upcoming British film
- Carnivel, a 1989 Malayalam film
- Karnaval, a 1999 French film
- Carnivale, a 1999 French animated film by Millimages
- The Carnival, a 1984 Telugu documentary by B. Narsing Rao

=== Television ===
- "Carnival" (Bottom), a television episode
- "Carnival", a season 1 episode of The Bellflower Bunnies
- "Carnival", a 1997 episode of the series Teletubbies
- "Carnaval", a 2018 episode of the series Mickey Mouse
- "Carnival", a Malcolm in the Middle episode from season 2 (2001)
- "Carnival", a Series C episode of the television series QI (2005)
- Carnivàle, a 2003–2005 American television series

== Performing arts ==
- Carnaval (ballet)
- Carnival!, a stage musical
- The Carnival (play), a 1664 comedy by Thomas Porter
- Carnival Center for the Performing Arts

== People ==
- Danielle Carnival, American neuroscientist

== Other uses ==
- Carnival (video game)
- Carnival Food Stores

== Music ==
- Carnival Records

=== Classical music ===
- Carnaval (Schumann), an 1834–1835 set of piano pieces by Robert Schumann
- Carnival Overture (Dvořák), Op. 92, an 1891 concert overture by Antonín Dvořák
- Carnival, a c. 1934 composition by John Foulds

=== Performers ===
- The Carnival (band), a 1960s American pop group
- The Carnival Band (Canadian band), a Canadian marching band
- The Carnival Band (folk group), an English band
- Karnivool, an Australian progressive rock band
- Valya Karnaval (or Karna.val), a Russian video blogger, TikToker, and singer

=== Albums ===
- Carnaval (Barão Vermelho album) or the title song, 1988
- Carnaval (Ron Carter album), 1983; by Ron Carter, Hank Jones, Satao Watanabe, and Tony Williams, recorded in 1978
- Carnaval (Spyro Gyra album) or the title song, 1980
- Carnaval, by Wynton Marsalis and the Eastman Wind Ensemble, 1987
- Carnaval, by Zelda, 1983
- Carnival (Kasey Chambers album), 2006
- Carnival (John Handy album) or the title song, 1977
- Carnival (Maynard Ferguson album), 1978
- Carnival (New Model Army album), 2005
- Carnival (Randy Weston album) or the title song, 1975
- Carnival, by Bryce Vine, 2019
- Carnival, by Gilli, 2022
- Wyclef Jean Presents The Carnival or the title song, 1997
- The Carnival, self-titled album by The Carnival (band), 1969

=== EPs ===
- Carnival (B.A.P. EP) or the title song, 2016
- Carnival (Duran Duran EP), 1982
- Carnival, by Bvndit, 2020

=== Songs ===
- "Carnaval" (song), by Maluma, 2014
- "Carnaval", by Claudia Leitte featuring Pitbull, 2018
- "Carnaval", by Santana from Festival, 1977
- "Carnival" (The Cardigans song), 1995
- "Carnival" (Ch!pz song), 2005
- "Carnival" (Eric Clapton song), 1977
- "Carnival" (Natalie Merchant song), 1995
- "Carnival" (¥$ song), 2024
- "Manhã de Carnaval" ("Carnival Morning"), written by Luiz Bonfá and Antônio Maria; covered by several performers as "Carnival", an English-language version
- "Sobre las olas" ("Over the Waves"), written by Juventino Rosas; covered by the Beach Boys as "Carnival (Over the Waves)"
- "Carnival", by Bikini Kill from Revolution Girl Style Now, 1991
- "Carnival", by Gorillaz from Humanz, 2017
- "Carnival", by Kneecap from Fenian, 2026
- "Carnival", by Our Lady Peace from Clumsy, 1997
- "Carnival", by the Pillows, 1999

== See also ==
- Carnevale (disambiguation)
- Karneval (disambiguation)
- Carny (disambiguation)
