= The Carnival Band =

The Carnival Band may refer to:

- The Carnival Band (Canadian band), a marching band and community orchestra based in East Vancouver, Canada
- The Carnival Band (folk group), an English early music group

== See also ==
- Carnival (disambiguation)§Performers
