= Carnevali =

Carnevali is an Italian surname. Notable people with the surname include:

- Daniel Carnevali (born 1946), Argentine footballer
- Emanuel Carnevali (1897–1942), Italian-American writer
- Vincenzo Carnevali (1779–1842), Italian painter
- Vito Carnevali (1888–c. 1960), Italian composer

== See also ==
- Carnevale (disambiguation)
