= HONK! =

Street band festival that originated in Massachusetts, U.S.

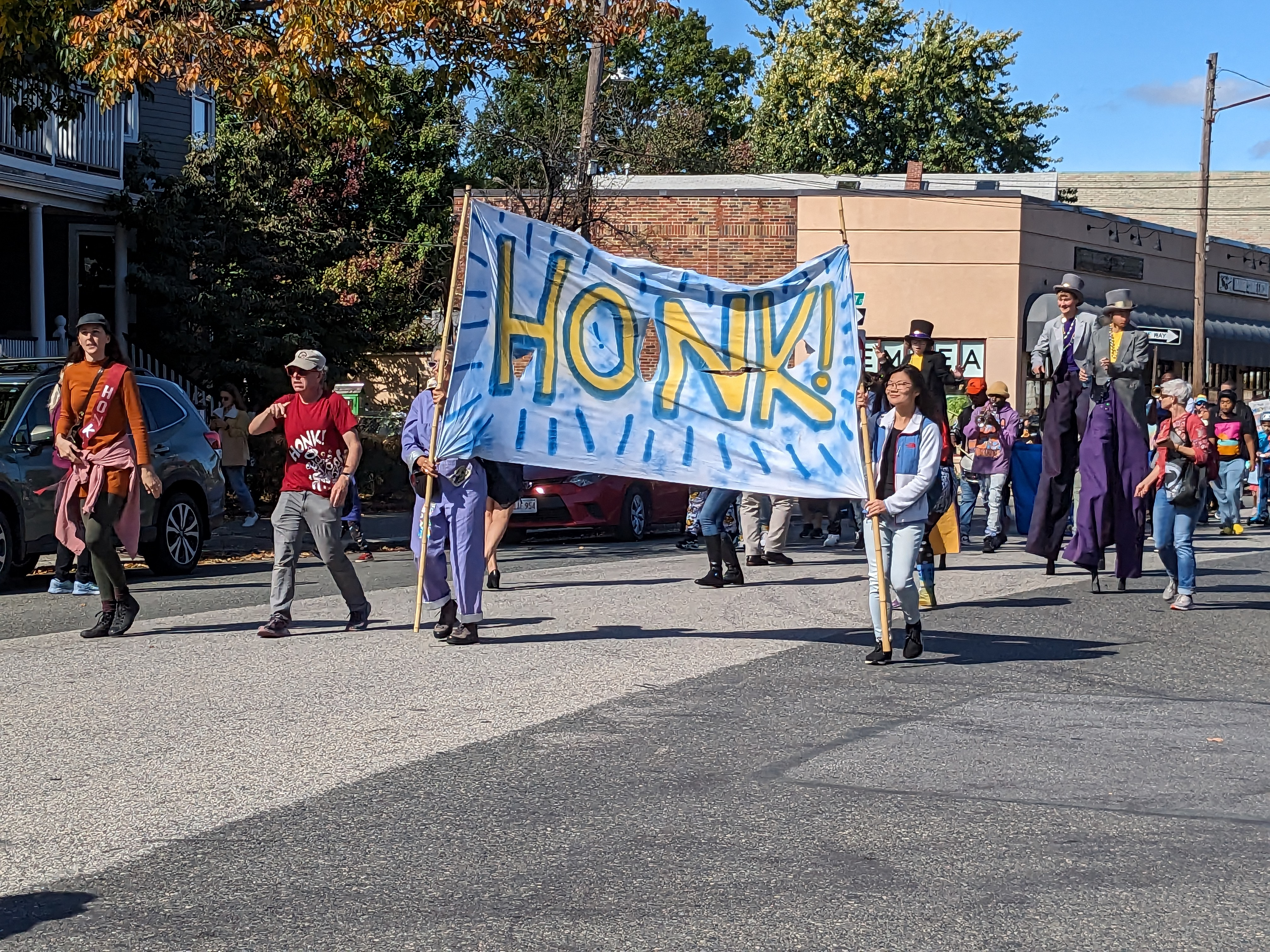
HONK! parade in Somerville, Massachusetts, October 2023

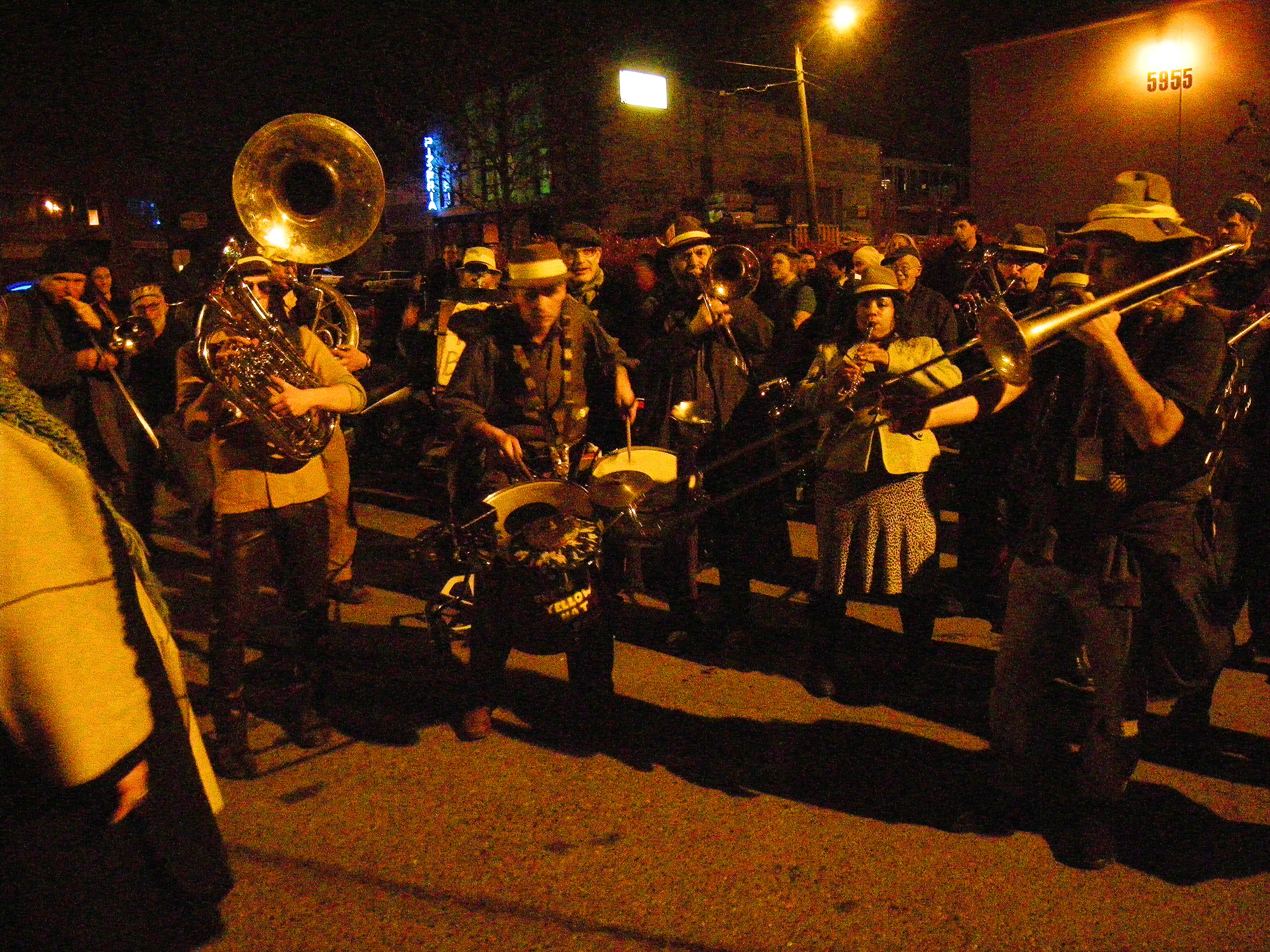
Yellow Hat Band spilling out into Airport Way S. near the corner of S. Vale St. late at night in Georgetown, Seattle, Washington during the first HonkFest West (2009).

HONK!, also known as HONK! Fest, is a festival of activist street bands held annually on all 3 days of the Indigenous Peoples' Day weekend in Somerville, Massachusetts. Each year since 2006, an all-volunteer organizing community invites more than 25 bands from around New England, North America, and the world to participate in this free three-day event that showcases acoustic and ambulatory bands playing free music in public spaces. Since its inception, it has inspired additional HONK! festivals in other locations.

== Description ==
HONK!s have been staged in Somerville, Massachusetts; Seattle, Washington; Austin, Texas; Providence, Rhode Island; New York, New York; Eugene, Oregon; Montpelier, Vermont; Spokane, Washington; Tacoma, Washington; Syracuse, New York; Vancouver, British Columbia; Rio de Janeiro, São Paulo, Brasília, Belo Horizonte, Brazil; and Wollongong, NSW, Australia. Although each festival is locally organized and there is no central HONK! authority, they share common features. Each HONK! invites up to over thirty bands, who play multiple sets in outdoor public spaces, sometimes over the course of two or three days. These shows are free to attend. Some HONK!s also feature a parade. The festivals are volunteer-run and get support from local sponsors.

The bands invited to play at HONK! share common characteristics: they are ambulatory, they use instruments that can be simultaneously carried and played, and they utilize little or no electronic amplification. As a result, the bands are able to play while moving. There is no generally agreed-upon label for this type of band; labels in use include "activist street band," "radical marching band," and "community street band."

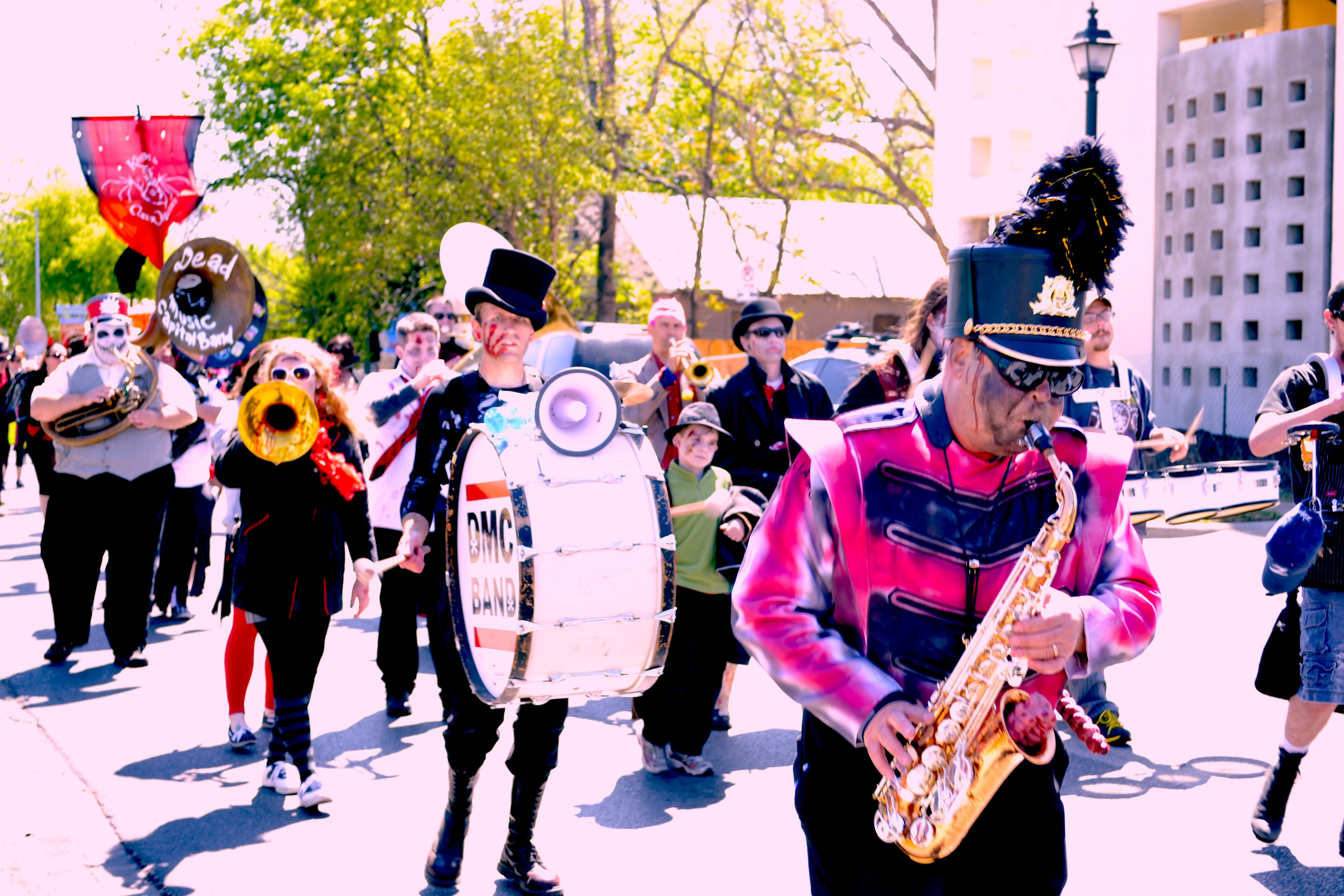
Dead Music Capital Band playing at the Honk! festival in Austin, TX. 2013

Although many of the bands that play at HONK! have the phrase "marching band" in their names, they bear only superficial resemblance to a traditional marching band. Traditional marching band characteristics derive from their military history: they tend to feature regimented, synchronized movement and matching uniforms, and play music that has been composed and arranged in advance, with the goal of presenting the band as a cohesive unit without any differentiation between individual members. Band members are typically drawn from and affiliated with some larger organization, such as a school.

A HONK!-style street band, on the other hand, more often tends to encourage the individuality of its members: it may have a theme to its garb rather than a uniform, with individual members free to implement that theme in a manner of their own choosing; similarly, its music may offer more chances for improvisation. Many HONK! bands incorporate traditional marching band instrumentation, sometimes augmented with other instruments or vocalists; others use instrumentation drawn from non-Western music traditions, such as those of a Brazilian samba school. A HONK! band may exist for a specific purpose—some perform primarily at activist events, for instance—but they are typically autonomous entities not affiliated with another organization.

== History ==
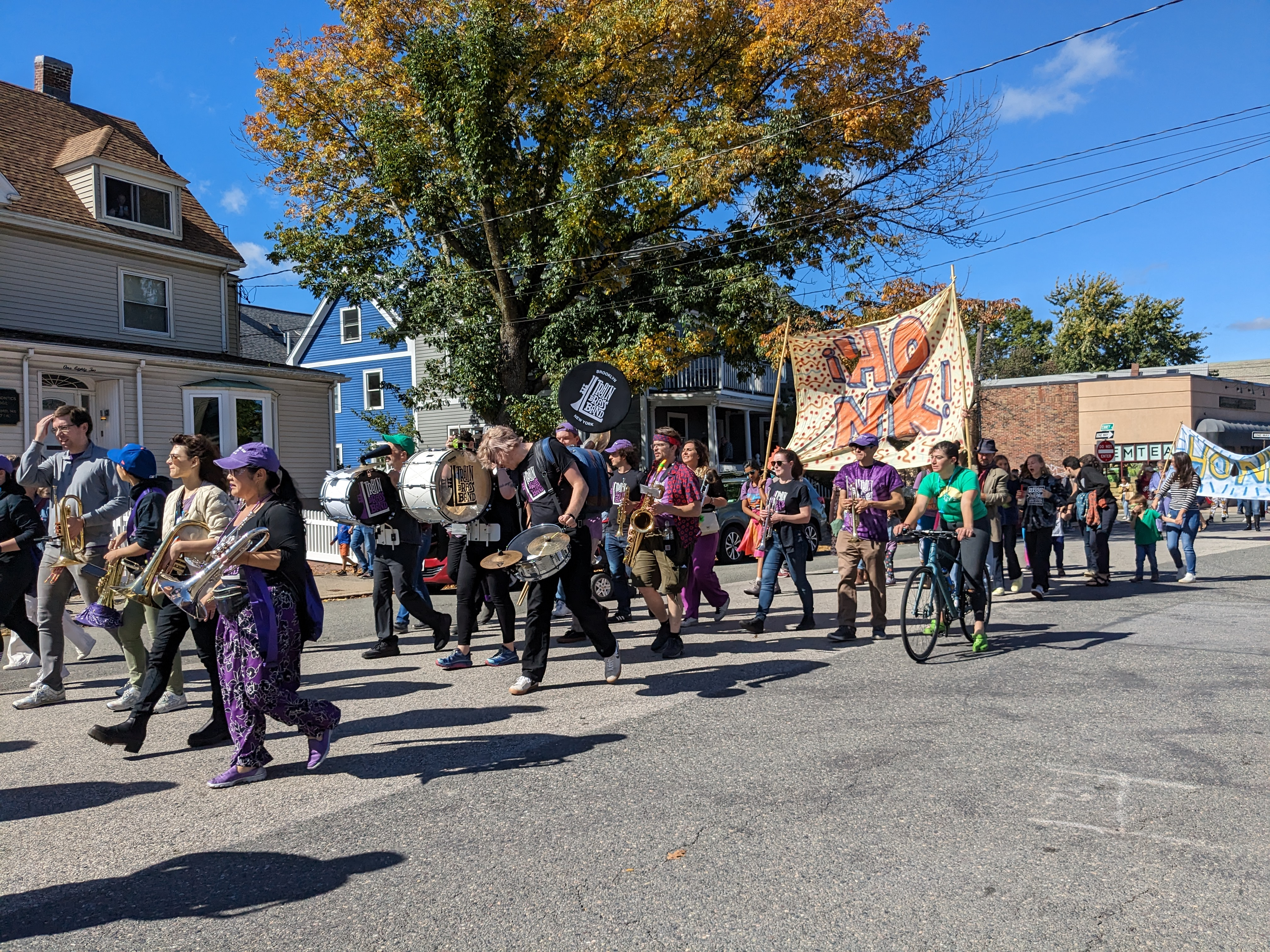
L Train Brass Band from Brooklyn, New York performing at the Somerville 2023 HONK!

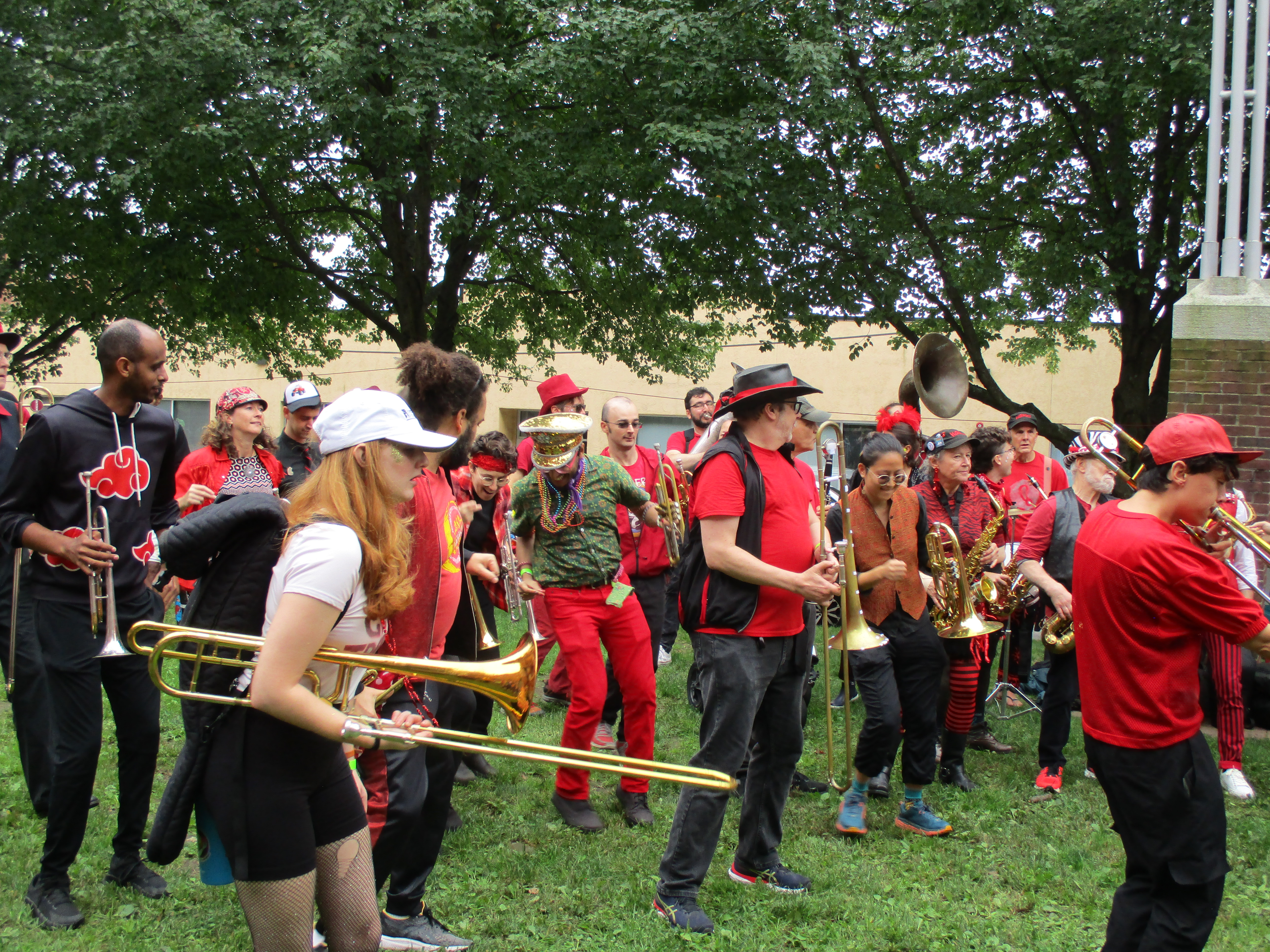
Good Trouble Brass Band from Somerville, Massachusetts performing at the Somerville 2023 HONK!

The longest-running HONK! has taken place in Somerville, Massachusetts' Davis Square neighbourhood every October since 2006. It was begun by a committee of members from a Somerville activist band, The Second Line Social Aid and Pleasure Society Brass Band, who saw the need for a gathering of like-minded souls interested in applying the joy of music to the work of promoting peace, social justice, and civic engagement. Since 2007, it has included a parade titled "Reclaim the Streets for Horns, Bikes and Feet!" The parade features the bands along with other non-musician participants, including puppeteers and visual artists such as the Bread & Puppet Theater and organizations that promote transportation alternatives and environmental and social justice, such as Bikes Not Bombs.

The COVID-19 pandemic in 2020 forced all of their events to online.

== Other HONK! Fests ==
HONK NYC! was born in 2007 when The Pink Puffers (Rome, Italy), Environmental Encroachment (Chicago), and March Fourth (Portland, Oregon), visited New York City following that year's HONK! in Somerville. Events around the city included a dinner party at the space The Change You Want to See on Havermeyer Street, hosted by members of Brooklyn's Hungry March Band. This set up a tradition of creating events for bands that wanted to visit NYC and play gigs after HONK! fest. In 2008, Titubanda from Rome were presented in parties, parades, parks, and rallies. In 2009, the name BONK! Brooklyn HONK Festival was adopted and used through 2011. The festival was renamed as HONK NYC! In 2012. In addition to small parades and free outdoor gigs, HONK NYC also has ticketed nighttime events in clubs and warehouse spaces.

HONK! Fest West has been held every spring in Seattle starting in 2008. In its second year, HONK! Fest West 2009 took place in several locales around Seattle: Friday night in Ballard, Saturday night in Georgetown, Sunday daytime at Gas Works Park and Sunday evening at The Vera Project. HONK! Fest West 2010 took place Friday night in Fremont, Saturday afternoon in the Central District, Saturday night in Georgetown, and Sunday afternoon at the Alaska Junction in West Seattle.

HONK!TX has been held in Austin every March starting in 2011. The 2011 festival took place on East Sixth Street on Friday, in the North University neighborhood on Saturday, and, following a march through the center of Austin, in Pan-Am Park on Sunday. Subsequent years have used South Congress instead of East Sixth.

HONK! Fest Eugene (PKA Yonk!) was founded in June 2015 when local Brazilian percussion ensemble Samba Ja hosted SambAmore (Arcata, CA), Environmental Encroachment (Chicago), Junkadelic (Australia) along with local bands Kef, The Beatcrunchers, and High Step Street Band on 2 outdoor stages. Since then it has been held every year in the Whiteaker neighborhood of Eugene the week following HONK! Fest West in Seattle. It features traveling groups from Seattle's festival as well as local percussion and brass ensembles. In 2017 the festival changed names from Yonk! to Honk! Fest Eugene and grew into a 2-day festival and retreat for touring bands.

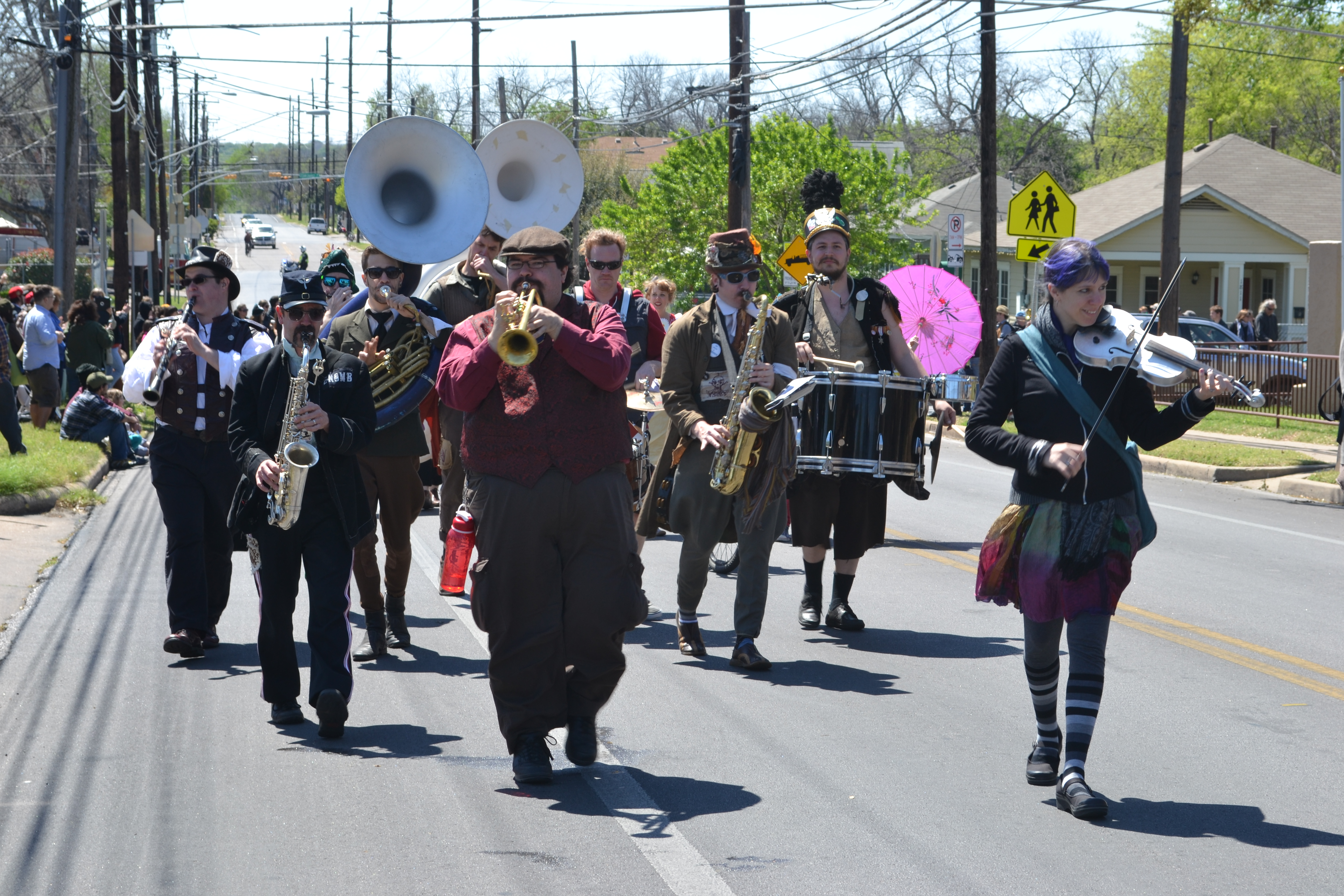
Emperor Norton's Stationary Marching Band playing at the 2013 HONK!TX

HONK!Oz was inaugurated in January 2015 in the community of Wollongong, New South Wales, Australia as a fringe festival of the long-running Illawarra Folk Festival in the nearby community of Bulli.

HONK!Rio was inaugurated in August 2015, taking place in various communities in and around the city of Rio de Janeiro, Brazil.

HONK SP takes place in São Paulo, Brasil and started in November 2017, bringing together a vast number of groups, including Brass Bands and Carnival "Blocos", occupying the city's districts.

PRONK! is a one-day festival in Providence, Rhode Island. It happens the day after the Boston-area HONK! ends and features many of the same groups that performed in Somerville and Cambridge over the weekend.

HONK!BC is the first Canadian version of the HONK! Festival and it was organized by Open Air Orchestra Society. It was inaugurated in August 2018 in Vancouver, BC and took place at multiple venues in the Commercial Drive area (East Vancouver) such as Britannia Community Services Centre, Strange Fellows Brewing, Grandview Park and The Legion on Commercial Drive.

Other festivals have been held in Brasília, Brazil in 2019, 2020, 2022, 2023 and 2025; annually in Tacoma, Washington since 2023; Belo Horizonte, Brazil in 2024 and 2026; Spokane, Washington in 2019 ("Sponkfest"); Montpelier, Vermont in 2017; and Syracuse, New York in 2019, 2021, and 2026 ("Salt City Honk").

== Participating Bands ==
=== HONK! (Somerville, MA) ===
Band	Appearances	2026	2025	2024	2023	2022	2021	2019	2018	2017	2016	2015	2014	2013	2012	2011	2010	2009	2008	2007	2006
aNova Brazil (Boston, MA)	17	Yes	Yes	Yes	Yes	Yes	Yes	Yes	Yes	Yes	Yes	Yes	Yes	Yes	Yes	Yes	Yes	Yes			
All For One Brass Band (New Orleans, LA)	2	Yes	Yes																		
Artesian Rumble Arkestra (Olympia, WA)	4			Yes					Yes			Yes	Yes								
Babadan Banda de Rua (Belo Horizonte, BRA)	1			Yes																	
Bahamas Junkanoo Jumpers, The (Boston, MA)	1																	Yes			
Band Land Brass Band (Cambridge, MA)	3						Yes	Yes	Yes												
Band Together (pickup band) (Somerville, MA)	2	Yes	Yes																		
Banda Internacional de Chelsea, La (Chelsea, MA)	1					Yes															
Banda Rim Bam Bum (Santiago, Chile)	1					Yes															
Banda Roncati (Bologna, Italy)	1																	Yes			
Barrage Band Orchestra, The (Baltimore, MD)	2																Yes	Yes			
Berkshire Resilience Brass Band (Southern Berkshires, MA)	1			Yes																	
Black Bear Combo (Chicago, IL)	4																Yes	Yes		Yes	Yes
Black Sheep Ensemble (Atlanta, GA)	2		Yes							Yes											
Blowcomotion (Austin, TX)	1			Yes																	
Bolschewistische Kurkapelle schwarz-rot (Berlin, Germany)	1							Yes													
Boycott (Somerville, MA)	2									Yes	Yes										
Brass Balagan, The (Burlington, VT)	13	Yes	Yes	Yes	Yes	Yes		Yes		Yes	Yes	Yes	Yes	Yes	Yes	Yes					
Brass Liberation Orchestra (San Francisco, CA)	8	Yes	Yes							Yes					Yes		Yes		Yes	Yes	Yes
Brass Messengers (Minneapolis, MN)	6										Yes			Yes	Yes	Yes		Yes	Yes		
Brass Queens (New York, NY)	1							Yes													
Brass Solidarity (Minneapolis, MN)	4	Yes	Yes	Yes	Yes																
Brasscals (Santa Barbara, CA)	1		Yes																		
Brassica and the Wild Sprouts (Pittsburgh, PA)	1	Yes																			
brassterisk (Somerville, MA)	4	Yes	Yes	Yes	Yes																
Bread and Puppet Circus Band, The (Glover, VT)	19	Yes	Yes	Yes	Yes	Yes		Yes	Yes	Yes	Yes	Yes	Yes	Yes	Yes	Yes	Yes	Yes	Yes	Yes	Yes
Caka!ak Thunder (Greensboro, NC)	6									Yes			Yes		Yes	Yes		Yes		Yes	
Carnival Band, The (Vancouver, BC)	6								Yes				Yes		Yes	Yes		Yes			Yes
Chaotic Insurrection Ensemble (Montreal, QC)	8								Yes		Yes		Yes		Yes	Yes		Yes	Yes	Yes	
Chaotic Noise Marching Corps (Seattle, WA)	4				Yes					Yes			Yes		Yes						
Church Marching Band (Santa Rosa, CA)	1														Yes						
Clamor and Lace Noise Brigade (Chicago, IL)	3		Yes		Yes			Yes													
Conical Cacophony (Boston, MA)	4	Yes		Yes	Yes	Yes															
DC Activist Street Band (Washington, DC)	2	Yes	Yes																		
DJA-Rara (Brooklyn, NY)	5											Yes		Yes	Yes	Yes	Yes				
Damas de Ferro (Rio de Janeiro, Brazil)	1									Yes											
Dead Music Capital Band (Austin, TX)	2									Yes		Yes									
Detroit Party Marching Band (Detroit, MI)	9	Yes			Yes				Yes		Yes	Yes		Yes	Yes	Yes	Yes				
Dirty Water Brass Band (Boston, MA)	16	Yes	Yes	Yes	Yes	Yes	Yes	Yes	Yes	Yes	Yes	Yes	Yes	Yes	Yes	Yes	Yes				
8-Bit Brass Band (Seattle, WA)	1	Yes																			
Emperor Norton’s Stationary Marching Band (Somerville, MA)	19	Yes	Yes	Yes	Yes	Yes	Yes	Yes	Yes	Yes	Yes	Yes	Yes	Yes	Yes	Yes	Yes	Yes	Yes	Yes	
Environmental Encroachment (Chicago, IL)	14				Yes			Yes	Yes		Yes	Yes	Yes	Yes	Yes	Yes	Yes	Yes	Yes	Yes	Yes
Expandable Brass Band, The (Northampton, MA)	14	Yes	Yes		Yes	Yes	Yes	Yes		Yes	Yes	Yes	Yes	Yes	Yes	Yes	Yes				
Extraordinary Rendition Band (Providence, RI)	17	Yes	Yes	Yes	Yes	Yes	Yes	Yes	Yes	Yes	Yes	Yes	Yes	Yes	Yes	Yes	Yes	Yes			
Factory Seconds (Somerville, MA)	2															Yes	Yes				
Fanfare Invisible, La (Paris, France)	1										Yes										
Fanfarra Feminina Sagrada Profana (Belo Horizonte, Minas Gerais, Brazil)	1							Yes													
Filthy FemCorps (Seattle, WA)	2			Yes						Yes											
Fly By Brass Band (Somerville, MA)	4	Yes	Yes	Yes	Yes																
Forward! Marching Band (Madison, WI)	13	Yes	Yes	Yes	Yes			Yes	Yes	Yes	Yes	Yes	Yes	Yes	Yes	Yes					
Funkrust Brass Band (New York, NY)	2	Yes		Yes																	
Ghost Town (Somerville, MA)	1				Yes																
Good Trouble Brass Band (Somerville, MA)	20	Yes	Yes	Yes	Yes	Yes	Yes	Yes	Yes	Yes	Yes	Yes	Yes	Yes	Yes	Yes	Yes	Yes	Yes	Yes	Yes
Gora Gora Orkestar (Denver, CO)	4				Yes							Yes		Yes	Yes						
Greenbelt Honk! Situation (Greenbelt, MD)	1		Yes																		
HONK Family Band (New York, NY)	3		Yes	Yes	Yes																
Hartford Hot Several (Hartford, CT)	4		Yes			Yes				Yes	Yes										
Hill Stompers, The (Los Alamos, NM)	3											Yes	Yes		Yes						
Himalayas (New York City, NY)	6												Yes		Yes		Yes	Yes	Yes	Yes	
Hungry March Band (Brooklyn, NY)	11			Yes				Yes		Yes		Yes		Yes	Yes	Yes		Yes	Yes	Yes	Yes
Ideal Maine Social Aid and Sanctuary Band (Portland, ME)	3	Yes	Yes			Yes															
Jamaica Plain Honk Band (JP Honk), The (Jamaica Plain, MA)	5	Yes		Yes	Yes	Yes	Yes														
Kandjanwou Rara (Boston, MA)	1		Yes																		
L Train Brass Band (Brooklyn, NY)	2		Yes		Yes																
Le Pompier Poney Club (Marseille, France)	1										Yes										
Leftist Marching Band (Portsmouth, NH)	20	Yes	Yes	Yes	Yes	Yes	Yes	Yes	Yes	Yes	Yes	Yes	Yes	Yes	Yes	Yes	Yes	Yes	Yes	Yes	Yes
Loyd Family Players (Oakland, CA)	3														Yes			Yes	Yes		
Lungs Face Feet (Pittsburgh, PA)	1														Yes						
Magnificent Danger (Boston, MA)	4	Yes		Yes		Yes	Yes														
MarchFourth Marching Band (Portland, OR)	2																		Yes	Yes	
May Day Marching Band (Pittsburgh, PA)	4	Yes	Yes	Yes							Yes										
Milwaukee Molotov Marchers, The (Wisconsin, US)	1															Yes					
Minor Mishap Marching Band (Austin, TX)	8								Yes			Yes	Yes	Yes	Yes	Yes	Yes	Yes			
Muses Tanguent, Les (Paris, France)	1												Yes								
Musicians Action Group (MAG) (San Francisco Bay Area, CA)	2				Yes				Yes												
New Creations Brass Band (New Orleans, LA)	4								Yes	Yes		Yes	Yes								
New Orleans Musicians 4 Palestine (New Orleans, LA)	1			Yes																	
Open Hand Orchestra, The (Portland, ME)	1															Yes					
Original Big 7 Social Aid and Pleasure Club (New Orleans, LA)	4											Yes		Yes					Yes	Yes	
Original Pinettes Brass Band, The (New Orleans, LA)	2										Yes							Yes			
Orkestar Zirkonium (Seattle, WA)	1																	Yes			
Pakava It (Moscow, Russia)	1												Yes								
Party Band, The (Lowell, MA)	13	Yes	Yes	Yes	Yes	Yes	Yes	Yes	Yes	Yes	Yes	Yes	Yes	Yes							
Perhaps Contraption (London, UK)	1													Yes							
Pink Puffers Brass Band (Rome, Italy)	3														Yes			Yes		Yes	
Plezi Rara (Brooklyn, NY)	3							Yes	Yes	Yes											
Primate Fiasco, The (Northampton, MA)	1														Yes						
Providence Drum Troupe (Providence, RI)	1			Yes																	
Rara Bel Poze (Boston, MA)	7			Yes	Yes	Yes	Yes	Yes	Yes	Yes											
Red Flame Hunters (New Orleans)	2								Yes				Yes								
Revolutionary Snake Ensemble (Cambridge, MA)	1																				Yes
Rise Up! Action Band (Seattle, WA)	1								Yes												
Rude Mechanical Orchestra (New York City, NY)	18	Yes	Yes	Yes	Yes			Yes	Yes	Yes	Yes	Yes	Yes	Yes	Yes	Yes	Yes	Yes	Yes	Yes	Yes
Samba Tremeterra (Cambridge, MA)	1																	Yes			
Sass-a-Brass (Kansas City, MO)	1	Yes																			
Scene Of The Crime Rovers, The (Durham, NC)	2																	Yes	Yes		
School of HONK (Somerville, MA)	11	Yes	Yes	Yes	Yes	Yes	Yes	Yes	Yes	Yes	Yes	Yes									
Seed & Feed Marching Abominable (Atlanta, GA)	7				Yes								Yes		Yes	Yes	Yes	Yes	Yes		
Siderais, Os (Rio de Janeiro)	1													Yes							
Springville All Star Marching Band, The (Springville, NY)	3															Yes	Yes	Yes			
Stick & Rag Village Orchestra, The (Jamaica Plain, MA)	1																				Yes
Summer Street Brass Band (Boston, MA)	1							Yes													
tint(A)nar (Quebec City, QC)	3											Yes			Yes		Yes				
Titanium Sporkestra (Seattle, WA)	1															Yes					
Titubanda (Rome, Italy)	1																		Yes		
TMB (Seattle, WA)	2				Yes							Yes									
TriBattery Pops (New York City, NY)	1																		Yes		
Undertow Brass Band (Providence, RI)	19	Yes	Yes	Yes	Yes	Yes	Yes	Yes	Yes	Yes	Yes		Yes	Yes	Yes	Yes	Yes	Yes	Yes	Yes	Yes
Unidos do Swing (São Paulo, Brazil)	1								Yes												
UNiTY Street Band (Syracuse, NY)	1	Yes																			
Unlawful Assembly (Minneapolis, MN)	2	Yes							Yes												
Veveritse (Brooklyn, NY)	3												Yes		Yes		Yes				
Vilains Chicots, Les (Paris, France)	1											Yes									
Yellow Hat Band (Seattle, WA)	2																	Yes	Yes		
Yes Ma’am Brass Band (Austin, TX)	6	Yes	Yes	Yes	Yes					Yes	Yes										
Young Fellaz Brass Band (New Orleans, LA)	7			Yes	Yes	Yes		Yes						Yes	Yes	Yes					

=== HONK! BC 2018 ===
- The Carnival Band, Vancouver
- Balkan Shmalkan, Vancouver
- Bloco Energia, Vancouver
- Home Going Brass Band, Vancouver
- Greenhorn Community Music Project, Vancouver
- Freddy Fuddpucker, from North Vancouver
- Thunderbird Alumni Band, from UBC
- Filthy FemCorps, from Seattle, WA
- Rise Up! Action Band, from Seattle, WA

=== HONK! Fest West 2010 ===
- Artesian Rumble Arkestra
- Banda Gazona
- BeatCrunchers
- Bolting Brassicas Marching Band
- Brass Messengers
- The Carnival Band
- Detroit Party Marching Band
- Environmental Encroachment
- Emperor Norton's Stationary Marching Band
- Extraordinary Rendition Band
- Garfield High School Bulldog Drumline
- Hubbub Club
- Hungry March Band
- Leland Stanford Junior University Marching Band
- MarchFourth Marching Band
- Minor Mishap Marching Band
- Orkestar Slivovica
- Orkestar Zirkonium
- Samba Já
- Seattle Seahawks Blue Thunder Drumline
- Sound Wave Sounders FC Band
- Titanium Sporkestra
- VamoLá
- Yellow Hat Band
- Yesterday's Chonies

=== HONK! Fest West 2009 ===
- BeatCrunchers
- The Carnival Band
- Environmental Encroachment
- Emperor Norton's Stationary Marching Band
- Hubbub Club
- Leland Stanford Junior University Marching Band
- Loyd Family Players
- MarchFourth Marching Band
- Orkestar Zirkonium
- Samba Já
- Seattle Seahawks Blue Thunder Drumline
- Second Line Social Aid and Pleasure Society Brass Band
- Sound Wave
- Titanium Sporkestra
- VamoLá
- Yellow Hat Band

=== HONK! Fest West 2008 ===
- Anti-Fascist Marching Band (Seattle)
- The Carnival Band (Vancouver, BC)
- La Banda Gozona (seattle)
- Samba Olywa (olympia)
- Environmental Encroachment (Chicago)
- Black Bear Combo (Chicago)
- Hungry March Band (Brooklyn)
- Samba Ja (Eugene)
- Santa Cruz Trash Orchestra (Santa Cruz)
- Weapons of Marching Destruction (Seattle) now Titanium Sporkestra
- Yellow Hat Band (Seattle)
- Vamola! (Seattle)
- Peace Bandits (Olympia) now Artesian Rumble Arkestra
- Ballard Sedentary Sousa Band (Seattle)
- Raging Grannies (Seattle)
