= Mitchell Dawson =

Mitchell Dawson (May 13, 1890 – 1956) was a Chicago writer and lawyer, known for his poetry, patronage of the arts, and legal columns. He was born in Chicago into an artistic family. His brother, Manierre Dawson was an abstract painter. Like his father, George Ellis Dawson, Mitchell became a lawyer after studying at the University of Chicago Law School in 1913. He practiced law with his father's firm until his retirement in 1954.

Dawson's friendship with William Carlos Williams and Alfred Kreymborg encouraged him to submit poetry to magazines like Poetry, The Little Review, and Others in the 1910s. He supported and contributed to the Chicago Literary Renaissance. Dawson then turned his focus to legal writing, contributing legal advice column called "Advice of Counsel" to the Saturday Evening Post, Esquire and The New Yorker. Dawson's column was popular due to its simplicity and his use of humor.

Throughout his life, he befriended and associated with members of the anarchist and dadaist movements, including Emanuel Carnevali, Man Ray, and Adolphe Wolff. Dawson co-edited a dadaist journal with Ray and Wolff named TNT in 1919, which some of Dawson's poems appeared in.

Dawson also wrote one novel, The Magic Firecrackers, in 1949, based on children's stories that he invented for his son Gregory. He was also the brother-in-law of writer Emily "Mickey" Hahn whose career began in part due to Dawson sending some of her letters from abroad to the New Yorker magazine.

In 1921, Mitchell married Rose Hahn and had three children: Hilary (later Schlessiger), Jill (later Metzger), and Gregory. He died in 1956 of Parkinson's Disease.
