= The Carnival Band (Canadian band) =

Canadian marching band and orchestra

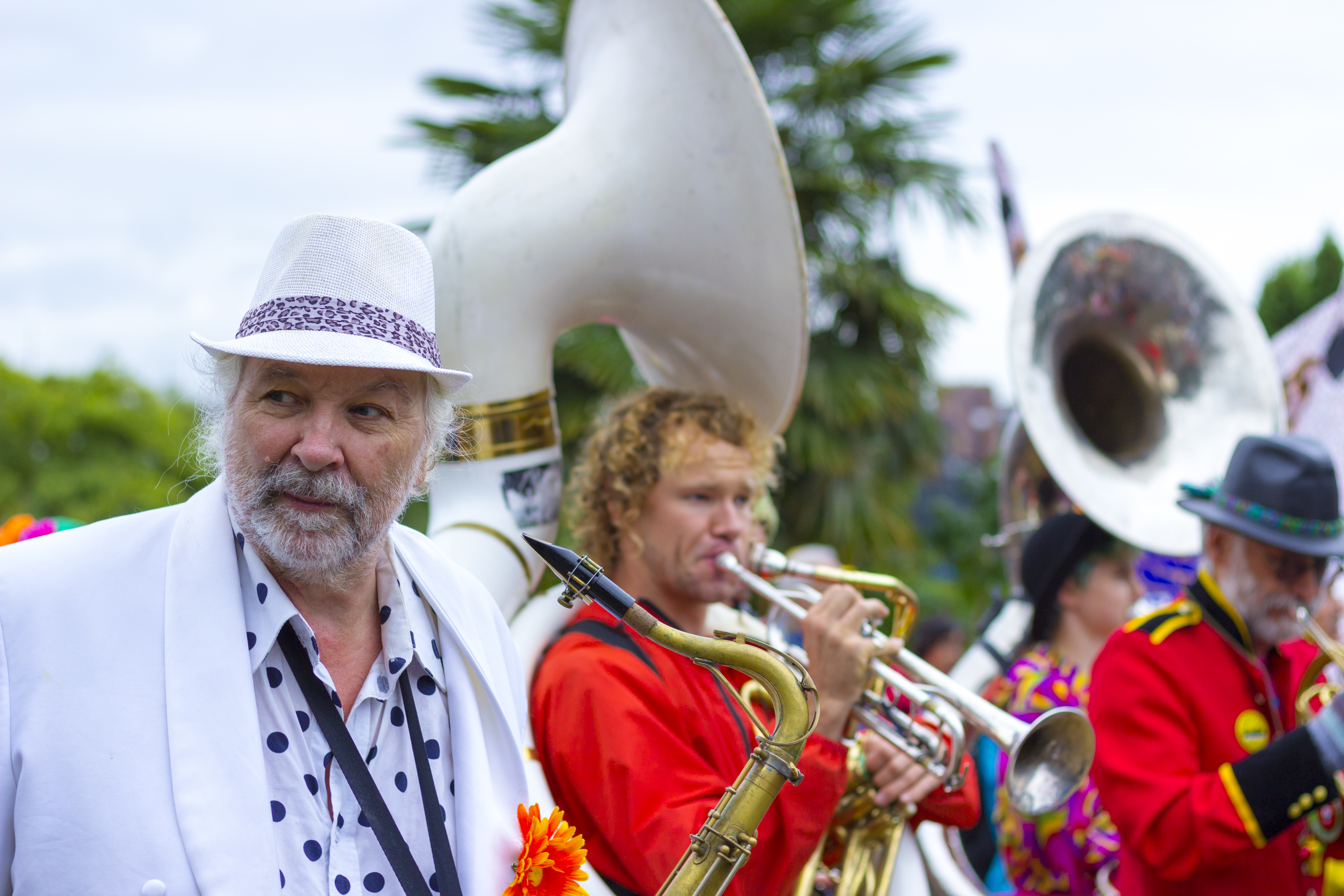
- The Carnival Band at a Kinder Morgan Pipeline rally.

Background information
- Origin: East Vancouver
- Years active: 1997–present

The Carnival Band is a large marching band and community orchestra based in the Commercial Drive area of East Vancouver, Canada. It is a part of the Activist Street Band movement, best known in the United States through the HONK! festivals.

The band has a floating membership of approximately 100 members playing sax, brass, percussion and stringed instruments. It has appeared as a mobile unit for parades and as an amplified band with bass, fiddle, guitar and banjo.

== History ==
=== 2007 ===
An unadvertised performance in London, England, led to the "internet phenomenon" of Traffic Wardens Need Love, created about a YouTube video (filmed by friends of Rainbow George Weiss) of the Carnival Band serenading traffic wardens.

Members of the band formed a board and incorporated as a not-for-profit society under the name The Open Air Orchestra Society on December 7, 2007.

=== 2008 ===
In the spring of 2008, the Open Air Orchestra Society began hosting regular workshops, which were free, open to the public, and led by Vancouver-based Latin and African percussionists. The society also organized and sponsored two trips for the Carnival Band: to the first annual Honk Fest West in Seattle and to Artopia and Seafest, two festivals held in the northern coastal islands of British Columbia. A community choir, Voice Mob, and samba dance group, the Carnival Band Dancers, also became active as performance troupes under the society umbrella.

=== 2009 ===
The band played at two international festivals: Honk Fest West (Seattle, Washington) and Honk! (Boston, Massachusetts); and two local festivals: Gibson's Jazz Festival and Vancouver Folk Music Festival. They also hosted their 10-year birthday festival, DecaDance, which featured the Carnival Band, the Yellow Hat Band, Orkestar Slivovica and Knifey-Spoony.

=== 2010 ===
When Vancouver hosted the 2010 Olympics, the Carnival Band supported the Poverty Olympics, the Welcoming Committee, an event at the Vancouver Art Gallery to advocate for social and environmental justice, and the Tent City Party, where Vancouver residents drew attention to the issues of homelessness in the city. The band also performed for the Place de la Francophonie on Granville Island several times during the Olympics. At the Place de la Francophonie, they collaborated with Big Nazo from Providence, Rhode Island. They also collaborated with the Bright Lights project during the Olympics.

The band hosted a 12-hour buskathon at the Vancouver Art Gallery.

Honk Fest West invited them to return to play in April.

The band also made another island tour, playing on Salt Spring Island for the first time.

== Performances ==
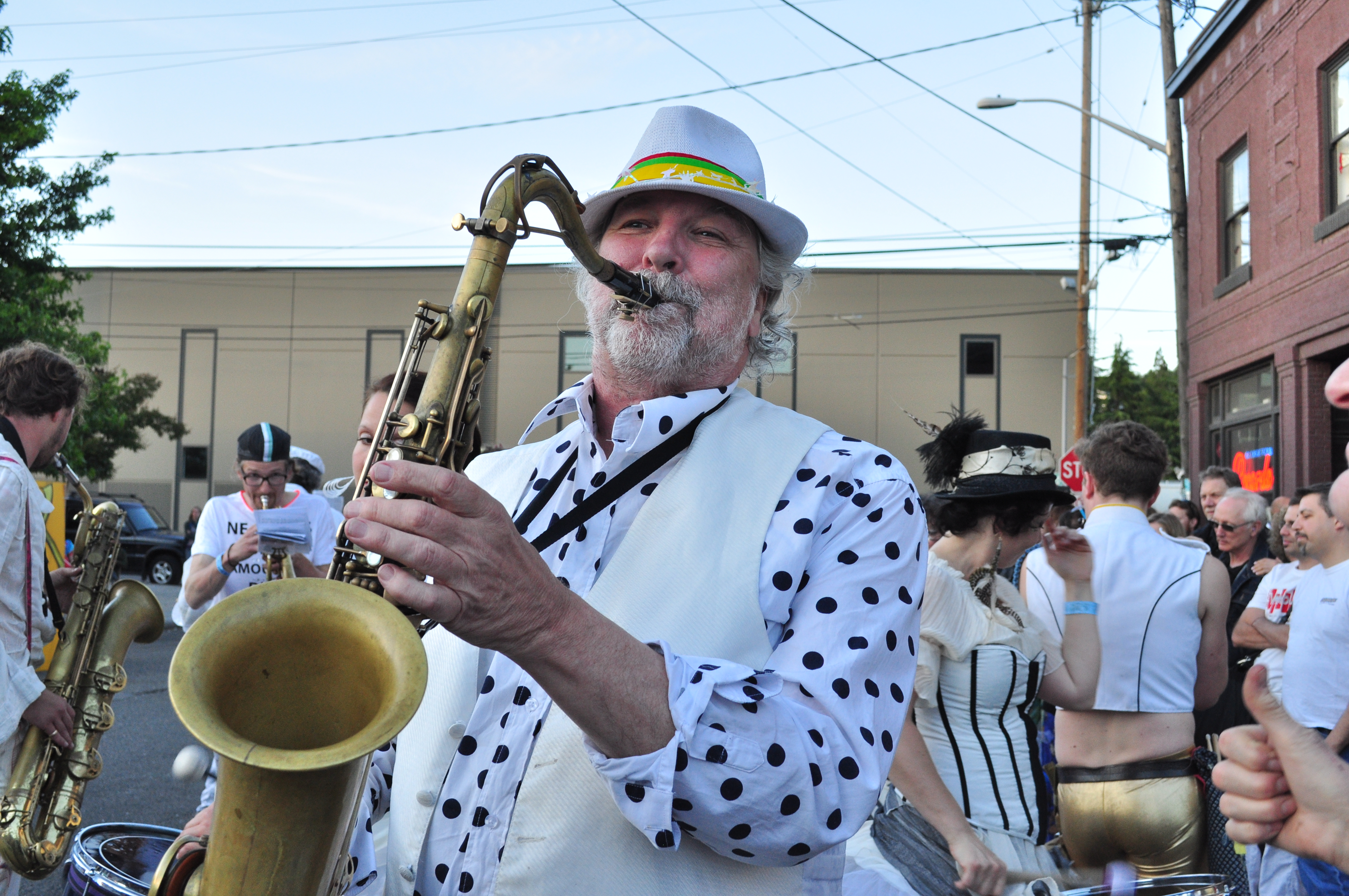
The Carnival band playing at Honk Fest West, Seattle, Washington, 2014

The Carnival Band has regularly appeared at peace marches, Critical Mass rides, Vancouver's Chinese New Year parades, Illuminares, and the Parade of Lost Souls. They have also performed at the Vancouver International Jazz Festival, the Gibsons Jazz Festival, the Blaydon Races and the International Street Band Festival hosted by the Tenth Avenue Band in Newcastle, with the Baybeat Streetband in Morecambe, the Vancouver Sun Run, and the Vancouver Children's Festival.

In October 2006, the Carnival Band traveled to Honk! Fest, in Somerville, Massachusetts, performing with the Hungry March Band and the Rude Mechanical Orchestra.

As part of 2007上海-浦东国际音乐嘉年华 (the 2007 Shanghai Pudong International Music Carnival), the Carnival Band performed during the Labour Day Golden Week in Century Park over the first week of May in Shanghai, China.

Their summer 2007 tour through Europe included performances at Altonale in Hamburg, Germany; Haizetara in Amorebieta-Etxano, Biscay, the Basque Country (Spain); and Le festival des fanfares de Montpellier in Montpellier, France.

In March 2008, the band participated in the first annual Honk Fest West in Seattle, Washington, a three-day convocation of alternative street bands from around the U.S., which included performances in the Ballard and Georgetown neighborhoods. The band returned to Honk Fest West in Seattle in 2009 and 2010, and to the original Honk! Festival in Somerville, Massachusetts.

== Music ==
Songs performed by the group include originals by musical directors Ross Barrett and Tim Sars; traditional songs from Colombia, France, Suriname, Afghanistan, and Bulgaria; and American and Canadian standards.

== Press ==
Coverage of the Carnival Band has appeared in the Ubyssey, Vancouver Sun, the Province, the Georgia Straight, the Vancouver Courier, and the Boston Phoenix.

The February 2006 issue of Spin magazine featured an article by Caryn Ganz on the Extra Action Marching Band, noting “now there are several artsy-oriented cities with envelope-pushing groups like them. In addition to New York's Hungry March Band, there are Portland, Oregon's March Forth [sic] Marching Band, Seattle's Infernal Noise Brigade, and the Carnival Band in Vancouver, all viewed by Extra Action as kindred spirits.”

When the Carnival Band performed in Shanghai, an article in the May 2 edition of 新民晚报 (the Xinmin Evening News) about the Shanghai Pudong International Music Carnival mentioned the band's entertaining performance and colorful costumes.

== See also ==
- Marching band
- Illuminares
- Parade of Lost Souls
