= Detroit Party Marching Band =

- Origin: Detroit, Michigan, United States
- Genres: Brass band Marching band
- Years active: 2009–present
- Website: https://www.instagram.com/detroitpartymarchingband

The Detroit Party Marching Band is a guerrilla band based in Detroit, Michigan. The band appears at events unexpectedly.They have played at events such as Mardi Gras (2012, 2015, 2017, 2024, 2025), Theatre Bizarre, Noel Night, Hamtramck Blowout, Marche du Nain Rouge, 2010 Detroit Free Press Marathon, and HONK! in Somerville, Massachusetts, as well as at many bars and parties throughout the Detroit area, both scheduled and unexpectedly. They have supported acts such as Band of Horses, Rebirth Brass Band, and Undertow Brass Band. They have also toured the Netherlands in Europe as part of the Cross-Linx Music Festival in 2014.

The band was founded by Rachel Harkai and John and Molly Notarianni. They were inspired to start the band after a trip to HONK! in late 2009 as well as seeing the second line bands in New Orleans during Mardi Gras. Its repertoire is a mix of Balkan and Balkan-inspired songs as well as modern pop and R&B rearranged for brass, usually by the members themselves.
