= Carnevale =

Carnevale may refer to:

== Festivities ==
- Carnival, a festive season at the close of the Christian pre-Lenten period
- Carnival of Venice (Italian: Carnevale di Venezia), an annual festival in Venice, Italy
- Carnevale in Adelaide, an annual Italian festival in Adelaide, South Australia

== People ==
- Andrea Carnevale (born 1961), Italian football player
- Ben Carnevale (1915–2008), American basketball coach
- Corrado Carnevale (1930–2026), Italian judge
- Dan Carnevale (1918–2005), American baseball player, manager and scout
- Fra Carnevale (c. 1420/25 – 1484), Italian Renaissance painter
- Giovanni Carnevale (1924–2021), Italian priest
- Graciela Carnevale (born 1942), Argentine artist
- John Carnevale (born 1961), American politician
- Mark Carnevale (born 1960), American golfer
- Massimo Carnevale (born 1967), Italian cartoonist
- Roberto Carnevale (born 1966), Italian composer

== See also ==
- Carnevali, a surname
- Carnivàle, an American television series
- Carnival (disambiguation)
