= Myra Bairstow =

American art historian

Myra Bairstow is an American writer and independent art scholar and curator. She was the co-author and director of the Manierre Dawson Catalogue Raisonné in collaboration with the Hollis Taggart Galleries published in 2011. Bairstow's curatorial exhibitions with the Taggart Galleries include "Manierre Dawson: American Pioneer of Abstract Art" (New York), "Manierre Dawson: New Revelations" (Chicago) and "Manierre Dawson" A Catalogue Raisonné (New York).

== Play and lecture series on Dorothy Hale and Frida Kahlo's painting ==
The cast and Myra Bairstow (center) of "The Rise of Dorothy Hale" after ringing the NASDAQ closing bell on 10-18-2007

"The Rise of Dorothy Hale", written by Bairstow, premiered off-Broadway at The St Luke's Theatre in New York City in September 2007. The play was based on the 1938 portrait of Dorothy Hale that was painted by Mexican artist Frida Kahlo titled "El Suicidio de Dorothy Hale." The cast members and playwright were featured guests of NASDAQ on October 28 to ring the closing bell. Myra was also featured in NBC 10 Philadelphia's documentary on Frida Kahlo, titled "Frida" which was filmed in conjunction with the traveling Kahlo exhibit "Frida Kahlo: National Homage 1907-2007" that appeared at the Philadelphia Museum of Art.

In March 2012, Myra presented a lecture at the Los Angeles County Museum of Art (LACMA) about Dorothy Hale and Frida Kahlo's painting titled "Frida Kahlo's Portrait of Dorothy Hale: Dreams, Dramas, and Revelations." The lecture was presented at LACMA's Bing Theatre in conjunction with their exhibition "In Wonderland: The Surrealist Adventures of Women Artist in Mexico and the United States."
