= Seed & Feed Marching Abominable =

The Seed & Feed Marching Abominable
- Seed & Feed Marching Abominable Logo

Background information
- Origin: Atlanta
- Genre: Marching band
- Years active: 1974–present
- Website: www.seedandfeed.org

The Seed & Feed Marching Abominable is a street band from Atlanta, Georgia. The band is composed of volunteers from all walks of life and can range in size from ten to over one hundred performers at any given performance. Most of their music comes from songs arranged for marching bands, including Swing, Latin, Marches and some notable original pieces. Performing at home and on the road in festivals, on stages and in unexpected places, they play in support of community events and fundraisers of all kinds.

== History ==
The band was formed in 1974 as an outgrowth of a community theater. Kelly's Seed & Feed Theater was formed in 1973 by founder Kelly Morris. Kelly wanted a band associated with his theater, one that would later appear in stage shows. The theater closed its doors in 1979, but the band that was formed originally by many of its actors has lived on. The band's first public performance was after a production of Sam Shepard's play La Turista on a spring night in 1974. There were no uniforms, no majorettes, and the band was led by a highstepping conductor keeping time with a broom. At this early event only two tunes were playable by the band: The Washington Post march and March Grandioso.

== Members ==
As noted above, members of the band come from a variety of backgrounds. The members are generally divided into following groups:

- Abominables play instruments, whether they are horns, drums, or accordions
- Abominettes wear majorette costumes and march in front of the band
- Despicables act somewhat like rodeo clowns, surrounding the band and providing crowd control or warning the other members of road hazards on the route
- Incorrigibles are children of band members

Alumni of the band who leave the Atlanta area have been known to form their own versions of the band in other cities. One example of this is the Hill Stompers, formed by two previous members who married and moved to Los Alamos.

== Performances ==
The band can be found playing in a wide range of locations throughout Atlanta. While some of the performances are sponsored, most are at community-oriented events such as the Little Five Points Halloween Festival, the Inman Park Festival and Tour of Homes and the Spoleto Festival USA in Charleston, South Carolina. However, the Seed & Feed is best known for its trademark "blitz" performances. During a blitz, band members will show up unannounced and unexpected at neighborhood bars, coffee shops, restaurants, grocery stores, book signings and subway stations playing to all who will listen. As a result, the mission of the band is sometimes stated as "bringing the gift of music to those who didn't know they needed it."

The band has some stock routines that they use during performances, including a version of Stars and Stripes Forever with a "wander and die" feature. During the trio, the members "wander" aimlessly and slow the tempo of the song until all the members lie "dead" on the ground. The band is then resurrected by a member playing When the Saints Go Marching In.

Some other notable performances:

- 2013: Performing in the annual HONK! Fest West music festival and Solstice Parade in Seattle
- 2008 - 2012: Performing in the annual HONK! Music Festival in Somerville, MA.
- 2005: Leading the annual Sweet Potato Queens Parade in Jackson, MS.
- 1994-1995: Performances with the Indigo Girls and a collection of other Atlanta-based bands in productions of Jesus Christ Superstar: A Resurrection. Recorded on CD (http://www.daemonrecords.com/jcs/index.htm), and live performances at three venues: Variety Playhouse (Atlanta, 1994), South by Southwest Music Festival (Austin, 1995), and summer concert series on the pier in Seattle (1995).
- 1990: When MARTA, Atlanta's rapid transit rail system, extended its train service to the Hartsfield International Airport, the band marched single file back and forth through the length of the train, playing Leaving on a Jet Plane and Off We Go into the Wild Blue Yonder.
