= Manierre Dawson =

American abstract painter (1887–1969)

- Born: December 22, 1887; Chicago, Illinois, U.S.
- Died: August 15, 1969 (aged 81); Sarasota, Florida, U.S.
- Notable work: Promrs Darrow Gnostic; Xdx; Discal Procession
- Style: Abstract art
- Website: www.manierredawson.com

Manierre Dawson (December 22, 1887– August 15, 1969) was an American abstract painter and sculptor. He was an early practitioner of abstract art in the United States (U.S)

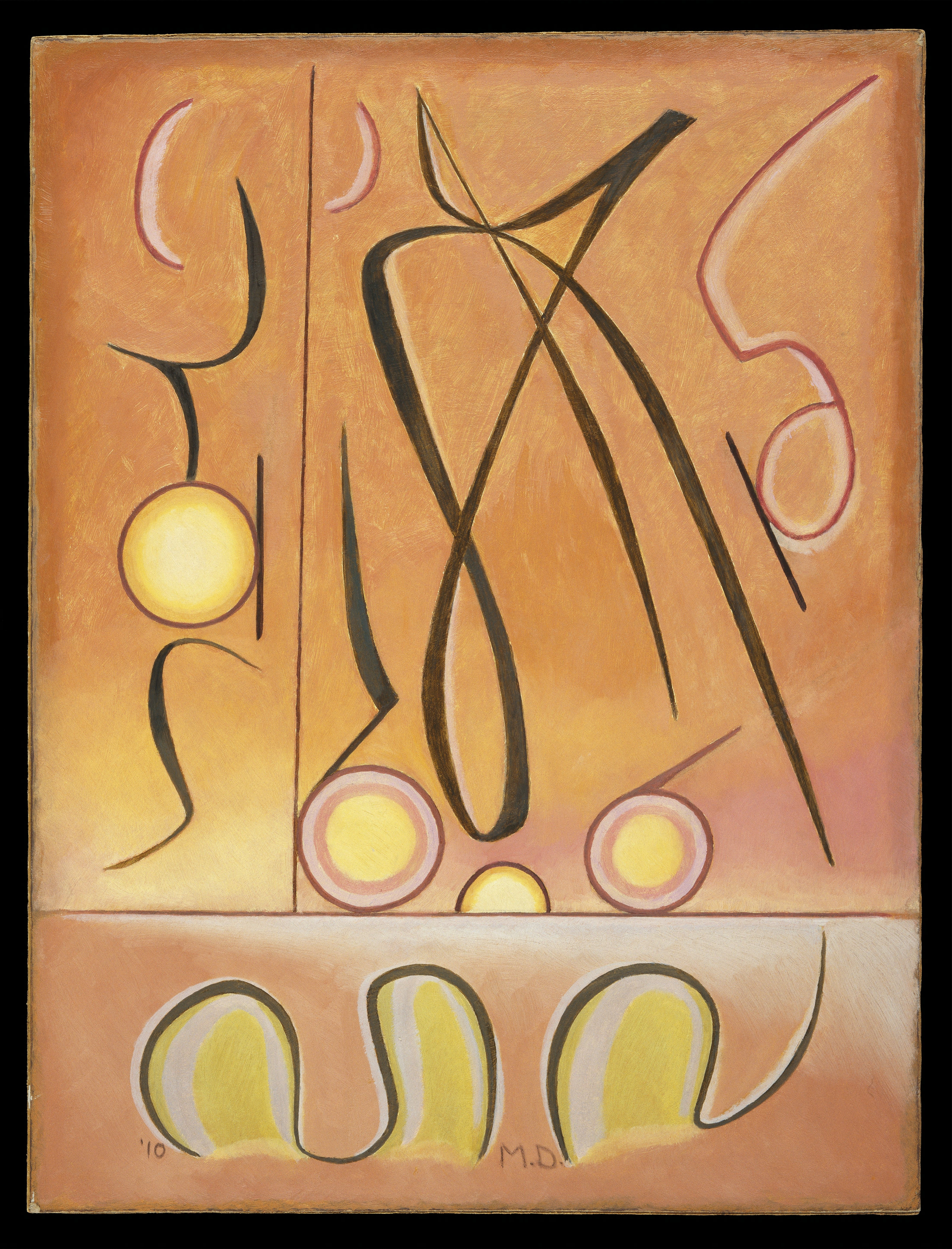
Xdx, oil on paperboard, 1910

== Personal life ==
Dawson was born and raised in Chicago, Illinois, and spent much of his later life in Michigan. He was the second oldest of four sons of George E. and Eva (Manierre) Dawson. His younger brother, Mitchell Dawson, worked as an attorney and poet.

== Early career ==
After completing high school, Dawson enrolled in the civil engineering program at the Armour Institute of Technology. His civil engineering studies influenced his creative vision. Mechanical drawing methods and descriptive geometry courses led him to paint in a geometric style by the end of 1908. His analytic geometry and differential calculus courses led to his first series of abstract paintings in the spring of 1910. At that time, he was in his first year at the Chicago architectural firm of John Holabird and Martin Roche.

After working at the firm for a year, he was granted a six-month leave of absence for an educational tour of Europe. He departed in mid-June 1910 for his only trip abroad. His itinerary is well documented in his journal. Disembarking in Liverpool, he made his way across England to France, south through Germany, across Switzerland to Italy, back north for a second stay in Paris, and around northern Germany before embarking from Bremerhaven in late November. He met John Singer Sargent in Siena and exchanged ideas on painting. During his return visit to Paris, he attended a Saturday evening party at the apartment of Gertrude Stein, and he saw paintings by Paul Cézanne in the gallery of Ambroise Vollard. Returning through Hoboken, New Jersey, he stopped in New York to meet with Arthur B. Davies, who introduced him to Albert Pinkham Ryder.

== Middle career ==
Between 1911 and 1914, he produced several paintings (Gedo, 1981). In December 1912, Davies invited Dawson to participate in the International Exhibition of Modern Art (better known as the Armory Show) in New York, which was to be held from February 15 to March 15, 1913. However, Dawson declined, stating that he had nothing appropriate to send. When the exhibition came to Chicago, March 24 to April 15, 1913, he met Walter Pach and bought two paintings: Marcel Duchamp's Nu (esquisse) (Nude [study])—known now as Jeune homme triste dans un train (Sad Young Man on a Train)—and Amadéo de Souza Cardoso's Return from the Chase. While the Armory Show was still held in the Art Institute of Chicago, Dawson's employment with Holabird and Roche ended. The circumstances of his departure are not known.

In 1914, Dawson participated in two group exhibitions. One, organized by Davies and Pach in conjunction with the Montross Gallery in New York, traveled to the Detroit Museum of Art, the Cincinnati Museum of Art, and the Peabody Institute in Baltimore. The other, organized by the Milwaukee Art Society (now the Milwaukee Museum of Art), resulted in the sale of two paintings to Arthur Jerome Eddy.

During summers spent at his family’s house in Michigan, he produced numerous works and acquired basic knowledge of fruit cultivation and marketing. In the autumn of 1914, he relocated there permanently. He later met Lilian Boucher, the daughter of a local farmer, and the two married in July 1915. The couple had three children over the following five years.

== Later career ==
His civil engineering training is evident in his early work, and his experiences, particularly working on his farm, influenced his art later in his career. Fertility emerged as a theme in his work when he began to make a living from the land and once he started a family. Similarly, the long hours in his orchards—pruning, spraying, and harvesting—inspired artistic compositions consisting of intertwining limbs. Originally conceived as sculptures but recorded as paintings in the late teens, some of these works were later realized in three dimensions. Living in rural Michigan and struggling financially, he created art using whatever was available (Portland cement, scraps of lumber, pieces of plywood). He laminated sheets of composite wood (brand names Novoply and Timblend) together for thickness and carved into freestanding sculptures. In the mid-1950s, he and his wife began wintering in Sarasota, Florida.

Recognition of his work began in 1966 with a retrospective exhibition organized by the Grand Rapids Art Museum. An exhibition organized by the John and Mable Ringling Museum in Sarasota, was shared with the Norton Museum of Art in West Palm Springs a year later. This exhibition brought Dawson to the attention of Robert Schoellkopf, who showed his work in New York in April 1969 and March 1981.

In 1968, Dawson was diagnosed with cancer. He sold his Michigan farm and moved to Sarasota permanently, where he died on August 15, 1969.

== Major paintings ==
- Prognostic, 1910, Milwaukee Museum of Art
- Xdx, 1910, Brooklyn Museum of Art
- Discal Procession, 1910, Smithsonian American Art Museum, Washington, DC
- Lucrece, 1911, The John and Mable Ringling Museum of Art, Sarasota
- Mrs. Darrow, 1911, Art Institute of Chicago
- Meeting (The Three Graces), 1912, Metropolitan Museum of Art, New York
- Figures in Action (Struggle), 1912, Virginia Museum of Fine Arts, Richmond
- Retrospect, 1913, The Museum of Modern Art, New York
- Letters and Numbers, 1914, Hirshhorn Museum and Sculpture Garden, Smithsonian Institution, Washington, DC
- Figure by Window, 1915, Illinois State Museum, Springfield

== Selected exhibitions ==
- Exhibition of Paintings and Drawings, Montross Gallery in New York, February 2–23, 1914; the Detroit Museum of Art, Mar. 1–14, 1914; Cincinnati Museum of Art, March 19–April 5, 1914; and the Peabody Institute, Baltimore, Apr. 15–May 15, 1914.
- Manierre Dawson, Milwaukee Art Institute, Jan. 1923.
- Retrospective Paintings by Manierre Dawson, Grand Rapids Art Museum, Michigan, April 3–24, 1966.
- Manierre Dawson: Paintings 1909-1913, Ringling Museum of Art, Sarasota, Florida November 6–26, 1967, Norton Gallery and School of Art, West Palm Beach, Florida, January 6-February 18, 1968.
- Manierre Dawson, Robert Schoelkopf Gallery, New York, April 5-May 1, 1969.
- Manierre Dawson: Painter, Sculptor, 1887-1969,1975, Sarasota Art Association, Sarasota Florida, 1975
- Manierre Dawson (1887-1969): A Retrospective Exhibition of Painting, Museum of Contemporary Art, Chicago, November 13-January 2, 1977. Indiana University Art Museum, Bloomington, January 18-February 20, 1977; Maryland Art Gallery, University of Maryland, College Park, March 29-May 1, 1977.
- Manierre Dawson, Paintings 1910-1914, Robert Schoelkopf Gallery, New York, March 28-April 22, 1981.
- Manierre Dawson (1887-1969): American Modernist Painter, Tildon-Foley Gallery, New Orleans, May 21-June 30, 1988.
- Manierrre Dawson Early Abstractionist, Whitney Museum of American Art, New York, July 8-June 30, 1988.
- Manierre Dawson American Pioneer of Abstract Art, Hollis Taggart Galleries, New York, October 1–30, 1999.
- Manierre Dawson American Pioneer of Abstract Art, Swope Art Museum, Terre Haute, Indiana, December 1–30, 2000.
- Manierre Dawson: New Revelations, Hollis Taggart Galleries, Chicago, May 1-June 15, 2003.
- Manierre Dawson: A Startling Presence, Illinois State Museum, Springfield, March 12–August 6, 2006.
- Manierre Dawson (1887–1969), Hollis Taggart Galleries, New York, April 7–30, 2011.

== Selected bibliography ==
- Ploog, Randy J., Myra Bairstow, and Ani Boyajian, Manierre Dawson (1887-1969): A Catalogue Raisonne (The Three Graces in association with Hollis Taggart Galleries, New York, 2011).
- Bluhm, Sharon K.,"Manierre Dawson: Inventions of the Mind," Ludington, Michigan: Humps Hollow Historical Press, 2012.
- Hey, Kenneth R., "Manierre Dawson: A Fix on the Phantoms of the Imagination," Archives of American Art Journal 14, no. 4 (1974), pp. 7–12.
- Davidson, Abraham, A. "Two from the Second Decade: Manierre Dawson and John Covert," Art in America 63, no. 5 (Sept. 1975), pp. 50–55.
- Powell, Earl A. III, "Manierre Dawson's 'Woman in Brown,'" Arts Magazine 51, no. 1 (Sept. 1976), pp. 76–77.
- Gedo, Mary M. "Manierre Dawson: The Prophet in His Own Country," American Art Review 4, no. 3 (Dec. 1977), pp. 64–75, 121–125.
- Gedo, Mary Mathews, "Modernizing the Master: Manierre Dawson's Cubist Transliterations," Art Magazine 55, no. 8 (April 1981), pp. 135–145.
- Adams, Henry and Randy J. Ploog, Manierre Dawson American Pioneer of Abstract Art (New York: Hollis Taggart Galleries, 1999).
- Ploog, Randy J. and Henry Adams, Manierre Dawson: New Revelations (Chicago: Hollis Taggart Galleries, 2003).
- Bates, Geoffrey, "Manierre Dawson: An Artist Out of Bounds," The Living Museum, 68, no. 1 (2006) pp. 8–13.
