= Karneval =

Karneval may refer to:

- Karneval, the German name for some instances of the Carnival in Germany, Switzerland and Austria
- Karneval, a 1975 song by Marianne Rosenberg.
- Karneval (manga), a Japanese manga and anime series

== See also ==
- Carnival (disambiguation)
