= Dorothy Hale =

American socialite (1905–1938)

- Born: Dorothy Donovan; January 11, 1905; Pittsburgh, Pennsylvania U.S.
- Died: October 21, 1938 (aged 33); Manhattan, New York City, U.S.
- Spouse(s): Gaillard Thomas (19??-19??; divorced); Gardner Hale (m. 1927; died 1931)

Dorothy Hale (January 11, 1905 – October 21, 1938) was an American socialite and aspiring actress who died by suicide by jumping off of the Hampshire House building in New York City. Her husband's death, followed by several unsuccessful relationships, had left her financially dependent on her wealthy friends. The artist Frida Kahlo created a famous painting commissioned by Clare Boothe Luce, titled The Suicide of Dorothy Hale.

== Early life ==
Hale was born Dorothy Donovan, the daughter of a real estate agent, in Pittsburgh. In 1919, after attending a convent and a drama school, Hale left home to pursue a career. Her family hired detectives to find her, but she subsequently returned when her funds ran out. With the assistance of friends, she eventually landed a job in the chorus of a Broadway production of Lady, Be Good.

While she was studying sculpture in Paris, she married millionaire stockbroker Gaillard Thomas, son of the wealthy gynecologist T. Gaillard Thomas; the brief marriage ended in divorce.

She married Gardner Hale in 1927. Gardner Hale, the son of William Gardner Hale, was a fresco, mural, and society portrait artist. During this marriage, Dorothy Hale continued moving in creative, sophisticated, and upper-class social circles. In her west coast period, she socialized with artists Miguel Covarrubias, Rosa Rolanda, Frida Kahlo, and photographer Nickolas Muray.

== Career ==
Hale's stage work was limited to several seasons in stock companies and some work as a dancer and Ziegfeld girl. In the summer of 1935, Hale and her friend Rosamond Pinchot, another New York socialite and aspiring actress, opened in Abide with Me, a psychological drama written by their friend Clare Boothe Luce. Though the three friends enjoyed the experience tremendously, the play was panned and it died quietly. Pinchot went on to take her life by carbon monoxide poisoning in January 1938.

== Personal life ==
She lost her husband Gardner Hale when his car went over a Santa Maria cliff in December 1931. After this, she was left in severe financial difficulties. No longer able to maintain her high-society lifestyle, Hale began to accept the largesse of rich lovers and generous friends, such as Luce, with whom she was close. "We all believed that a girl of such extraordinary beauty could not be long in either developing a career or finding another husband. Dorothy had very little talent and no luck."

Hale repeatedly, yet unsuccessfully tried to find work as an actress. In 1932, an acquaintance with Samuel Goldwyn led to an uncredited role in Cynara, as well as a minor role in Catherine the Great (1934). Her screen tests were dubbed a failure.

=== Affairs ===
Hale was rumored to be romantically linked with Constantin Alajalov, a well-known New York cover artist.

Early in 1933, she and artist Isamu Noguchi took a Caribbean cruise where he was introduced to many of her wealthy and influential friends from New York, several of whom (including Luce) commissioned portraits for a sculpture bust. Noguchi traveled to London and Paris with Hale, hoping to find more patrons. Noguchi had begun a portrait sculpture of Hale, but it was never finished, and its fate is unknown.

In 1934, Hale and Luce accompanied Noguchi on a road trip through Connecticut in a car Noguchi had designed with Buckminster Fuller, the Dymaxion car. The trio stopped to see Thornton Wilder in Hamden, Connecticut, before going on to Hartford to join Fuller for the out-of-town opening of Gertrude Stein and Virgil Thomson's Four Saints in Three Acts.

By 1937, Hale was involved in a serious romance with Harry Hopkins, WPA administrator and Franklin D. Roosevelt's top adviser. Anticipating a "White House wedding", Hale moved into Hampshire House, a 36 story apartment building at 150 Central Park South, and began putting together a trousseau, but Hopkins abruptly broke off the affair. Luce said in later years that the White House was not happy about the Hopkins/Hale engagement rumors, and that may have been the cause of the break. The gossip columnists who had been reporting the engagement rumors played up the cruel jilting, causing Hale great embarrassment.

In 1938, Bernard Baruch advised Hale that at 33 she was too old for a professional career and she should look for a wealthy husband. Baruch even gave her $1,000 with the instructions, "to buy a dress glamorous enough to capture a husband."

Hale became despondent over her stalled career, constant debt, and unhappy love life.

== Death ==
=== Farewell party ===
The evening of October 20, 1938, Hale informally entertained some friends; she had told them that she was planning a long trip and invited them to a party. Among the guests were Mrs. Brock Pemberton; Prince del Drago of Italy; painter Dorothy Swinburne, who was married to Admiral Luke McNamee (president of the McKay Radio and Telegraph company); and Margaret Case (later Harriman, daughter of Frank Case), an editor at Vogue who would go on to write The Vicious Circle. After the party Hale went on to the theater with Mr. and Mrs. J. P. Morgan to see the Stokes' play Oscar Wilde.

After an evening on the town, Hale returned to her home at the Hampshire House at about 1:15 am, leaving a large number of friends partying at the 21 Club. On October 21, 1938, Hale threw herself out of the window of her apartment. Her obituary states her time of death to be 5:15 am, though Clare Boothe Luce recalled that she jumped "at about 6:00 am". She was found still wearing her favorite Madame X ''femme-fatale'' black velvet dress with a corsage of small yellow roses, given to her by Noguchi.

In his interview for Herrera's biography of Frida Kahlo, Noguchi would say of Hale:

She was very beautiful girl, all my girls are beautiful. I went to London with her in 1933. Bucky (Buckminster Fuller) and I were there the night before she did it. I remember very well she said, 'Well that's the end of the vodka. There isn't any more.' Just like that you know. I wouldn't have thought of it much, except afterward I realized that that's what she was talking about. Dorothy was very pretty, and she traveled in this false world. She didn't want to be second to anybody, and she must have thought she was slipping.

=== Frida Kahlo painting ===
Frida Kahlo. The Suicide of Dorothy Hale, 1939, oil on Masonite, 60.4 x 48.6 cm, Phoenix Art Museum, Phoenix, Arizona Translation of the legend: "In the city of New York on the twenty-first day of the month of October, 1938, at six o'clock in the morning, Mrs. Dorothy Hale committed suicide by throwing herself out of a very high window of the Hampshire House building. In her memory [...*] this retablo, executed by Frida Kahlo." * The words "Mrs. Clare Boothe Luce commissioned" were painted out of the legend by Noguchi at Luce's request after Kahlo delivered the commission.

Hale's friend Clare Boothe Luce, an ardent admirer of Mexican artist Frida Kahlo, almost immediately commissioned Kahlo to paint a recuerdo (remembrance) portrait of their deceased mutual friend, so that, in Kahlo's words, "her life [would] not be forgotten". Luce understood a recuerdo to be an idealized memorial portrait and was doubtless expecting a conventional over-the-fireplace portrait for her $400. After being shown in March in Paris, the completed painting arrived in August 1939. Luce claimed she was so shocked by the unwrapped painting that she "almost passed out".

What Kahlo created was a graphic, narrative retablo, detailing every step of Hale's suicide. It depicts Hale standing on the balcony, falling to her death, and also lying on the bloody pavement below. Luce was so offended that she seriously considered destroying it, but instead, she had the sculptor Isamu Noguchi paint out the part of the legend that bore Luce's name. Frida is quoted as saying in a note to Luce "I tried my best to do what I felt. Sinceramente..." and signed her name. Luce simply left the work crated up in the care of Frank Crowninshield, only to be presented with it again decades later, when Crowninshield's heirs discovered it in storage. She later donated it anonymously to the Phoenix Art Museum. The museum retains ownership, although the painting is frequently on tour in exhibitions of Kahlo's works.

In 2010, the painting was included in a "sweeping view" of Noguchi's career in the "On Becoming an Artist: Isamu Noguchi and His Contemporaries, 1922-1960" show at the Noguchi Museum in Long Island City, Queens, New York City.

== Portrayals and dramatizations ==
=== Stage play ===
The Rise of Dorothy Hale, written by Myra Bairstow, premiered off-Broadway at the St. Luke's Theater on September 30, 2007. The play explores the life and death of Hale through the creative process of Frida Kahlo and questions whether Hale's death was a suicide or a murder. The original cast members were Emmy Award winner Michael Badalucco, Patrick Boll, Sarita Choudhury, Laura Koffman, Sarah Wynter, and Mark LaMura. The cast and playwright of The Rise of Dorothy Hale were featured guests of NASDAQ on October 18, 2007, to ring the closing bell.

=== Fictional biography ===
Lady Be Good: The Life and Times of Dorothy Hale, written by former NBC News producer Pamela Hamilton, was published on March 31, 2021. Drawing on original research, the novel portrays Hale as a smart, talented, determined woman, upending the widely held belief that Hale was hapless. At the heart of the novel is Hale's friendship with Clare Boothe Luce and the life they led together in café society.

The End of the Vodka, written by Oscar de Muriel and was published on June 25, 2026. Based on Frida Kahlo’s shocking 1938 oil painting The Suicide of Dorothy Hale, which graphically depicts the fatal fall of American actress and showgirl Dorothy Hale, the novel reimagines the mystery surrounding her death. In 1938, Hale’s friend Clare Boothe Luce commissions Kahlo to paint a memorial portrait, but as Luce encounters the Duchess of Windsor in Paris and begins to question what really happened, Kahlo, estranged from Diego Rivera, wrestles with betrayal, ambition and the demands of her art. The novel explores whether Hale’s death was an act of despair or something far more sinister, set against the political and social power struggles of the era.
