= The Carnival (short story) =

- Short story by Michael W. Fedo
- Country: United States
- Language: English
- Genres: Short story, science fiction, horror

Publication

"The Carnival" is an American short story written by Michael Fedo.

It was published among other short stories, in the book Marjorie L. Burns (1980). How to Read a Short Story (Scholastic language skills). Scholastic Book Services. ISBN 978-0-590-30611-9. OCLC 8000874. OL 10699186M.

== Plot ==
The story concerns a nation that constructs a deadly amusement park to remedy its overpopulation problems. In charge of this operation is the Populace Control. People who win a ticket are sent to the carnival on a bus; cars would become a problem as many visitors do not return. Passengers who die are placed in black plastic bags and thrown into a mass burial pit. It focuses on a young boy (Jerry) who wins a ticket to the titular Carnival, much to his mother's grievance. It is revealed that Jerry is obnoxious and has a sense of invulnerability knowing that the possibility of living that day was one in eight. After he arrives, he realizes the park's true nature while on a ride called the "Thunder Clapper" that electrocutes some of its passengers, including the person next to him. The story ends as the protagonist is being thrown off a ride called the "Whirl-Away" to his death and the body is caught in one of the black bags.

=== Notes ===
- At the beginning it is unclear why most people on the bus to the carnival are miserable.
- Early in the story, the reader may not understand that the rides are literally "death-defying".
- Jerry's age, 16, is significant because people ages 16 to 25 are the most likely to understand his sense of fearlessness.
- Even though it is not directly stated in the story, some literary experts believe that visitors of the carnival are forced to ride the rides. It could also be argued that people chose to take their chances for various reasons.

Main theme: The odds are not always in your favor.

Sub-themes:

- Things are not always as they appear.
- The risk does not always justify the reward.
