= Noel Night =

Annual holiday event in Detroit, Michigan, U.S.

Noel Night is an annual holiday event that takes place in Detroit, Michigan, in the Midtown area of Detroit's Cultural Center. Typically on the first Saturday in December, this Cultural Center-wide “Open House” features free admission to many of Detroit's well-known museums, as well as many other activities such as horse-drawn carriage rides, carolers, music, dance, children's activities, arts and crafts, shopping, and its annual community sing-along led by the Salvation Army on the Woodward Avenue bandstand.

== History ==
=== 1973 ===
The first Noel Night took place on December 19, 1973, from 6 to 9pm. It was originally organized by the now disbanded art group, Detroit Adventure. They described Noel Night as the first cooperative event of its kind to happen in this area at this time of year for all the people of Detroit, Michigan. The organization's goal was to create an audience of participation through venues. Noel Night was their starting point. Performances consisted of high school, university and church choirs, the City of Detroit Recreation Department and school theater groups. A truck outfitted with a speaker system (referred to by Detroit Adventure as the “soundmobile”) drove Woodward Avenue, playing Christmas carols. There were also specific children-oriented activities at certain venues. Woodward Avenue was closed between Kirby and Putnam, and the entire road and surrounding buildings were opened to the public for use during the event. Participating institutions included the following: The Children's Museum, Detroit Historical Museum, Detroit Public Library, International Institute, The Cathedral Church of St. Paul, The Scarab Club, The Smiley Brothers Society for Arts and Crafts (now called the College for Creative Studies), U of M Rackham extension, and Your Heritage House. It was estimated that approximately 6,000 people attended the event.

=== 1974 - 1976 ===
The next three years maintained a format similar to the 1973 event. Participating venues included everything from the previous year in addition to the Detroit Community Music School, The Detroit Science Center, and The Detroit Institute of Arts. The sound mobile was redesigned as a larger rolling bandwagon in 1974. Television personalities John Kelly and Marilyn Turner both lead the community sing-along from that bandwagon that year. In 1975, a large ice sculpture was placed in the center of Woodward Avenue for the duration of the 3 hour event. In 1976, attendance was estimated at 8,000.

=== 1977 - 1978 ===
Over the years, there have been many organizations to be added to the participation in the Noel Night event. As more of these organizations have been added, the larger the crowds. In 1977, the outdoor mobile stage was first introduced. It is still in use today. The ice sculpture activity, which was first introduced in 1978, is also used in Noel Night each year.

== Buildings/Vendors ==
When the first Noel Night started in 1973, there were 10 institutions that participated in the event. The most recent event took place in 2016 with over 60 midtown venues. It is estimated that over 35,000 people showed up to the event. Some of the places that have participated include The Detroit Institute of Arts, Charles H. Wright Museum of African American History, Detroit Historical Museum, Detroit Public Library, Detroit Medical Center, Detroit Science Center, and Old Main (Wayne State University).

== Activities/Performances ==
The festivities that occur on Noel Night take place both in and around Midtown Detroit's Cultural Center institutions, mainly between the areas of Cass to John R and Ferry to Warren. There are a huge variety of activities that occur on this event such as musical performances, tours of historic buildings, holiday shopping, demonstrations ranging from dances to crafting techniques, food and refreshments throughout various buildings, and photo opportunities with Santa. Noel Night is an event that showcases Detroit's arts and cultural assets and the wellspring of activity and creativity in the Midtown Detroit neighborhood.

Midtown Detroit, Inc., a nonprofit community development organization that supports economic growth in Detroit's Midtown district, is responsible for the production of Noel Night.

== Future ==
Since the event began, Noel Night has maintained a fairly consistent growth rate. With Noel Night being noted as one of the top grossing nights for the many Detroit restaurants in the metro area, the economic benefits from this event have proved to be great for the neighborhood. In the future, Noel Night is predicted to increase the event attendance by collaborating with more organizations.

== 2017 Shooting Incident and Event Cancellation ==
On December 2, 2017 the Noel Night event was disrupted and ultimately cancelled and the streets evacuated when a 16 year old juvenile produced a firearm and fired four shots, injuring 4 spectators. The injuries were not life-threatening. Detroit Police were investigating what caused the argument during which the juvenile fired the weapon. The suspect was identified but the identity was not released as of December 4, 2017 pending a decision whether to charge the individual as an adult. The shots fired caused a minor stampede and resulted in city officials declaring the event cancelled and by 8:30 pm streets were closed, and the surrounding Wayne State University buildings were on temporary lockdown.

== 2020 Cancellation ==
In late September 2020, the COVID-19 pandemic brought on its first cancellation in three years.
