= Hungry March Band =

American brass band

The Hungry March Band
- Origin: New York City
- Genres: Brass band/Marching band
- Years active: 1997–present
- Labels: The Hungry March Band has self-produced four full-length CDs and one recent Live CD
- Members: Percussion: Theresa Westerdahl aka Tara Fire Ball, Benjamin Cerf, Ron Tucker, Danny DiGiuseppe, Ben Cliness, Kris Anton; Sousaphones: Tom Abbs, Harry Phillips, Jessica Stanley; Trombones: Elizabeth Arce, Tom McHugh, Daniel Toretsky; Saxes: Emily Fairey, Sasha Sumner, Jason Candler, Tove Langhof, Maury Martin; Trumpets: "Cousin" Johnny Heyenga, Jeremy "Mush1" Mushlin, John Waters, James Rose; Pleasure Society: Sarah King, Debbie Stamos, Jill Woodward, Monica Vela, Sandra Glazer
- Past members: Percussion: Dreiky Caprice, Tim Hoey, Darius 'Boom Boom' Macrum, Noah, Doug Anson, Michele Hardesty, Bloody Rich Hutchins, Julie Hair, Adam Loudermilk, Ben Holtzman, Quince Marcum, Emily Geller, Samantha Tsistinas, Kevin Raczka, David Rogers-Berry, Anders Nelson, Myles Bramble; Sousaphones: Scott Moore, Joe "Tuba" Keady, John Barker, Don Godwin, Ben Fausch, Joe Correia; Trombones: Sebastian Isler, Gam Mitkevich, Juliet Echo (Jen Emma), Ben Meyers, Ethan Andrews, Ben Shanley, Cecil Scheib, Saxes: Greg Squared, Ruth Walker, Julien "Ür" Lemiere, Tomohiko "Okkon" Yokoyama; Trumpets:John Lewis, Toto Feldman, Fabrice Carrier, Atsushi Tsumura, JR Hankins; Pleasure Society: Libby Sentz, Jean Loscalzo, Urania Mylonas, Mary Jane Hunter, Veronica Dougherty, Ann Mazzocca, Evelyn Fugate, Paul Fly, Albert Guitjens, Sara Valentine
- Website: www.hungrymarchband.com

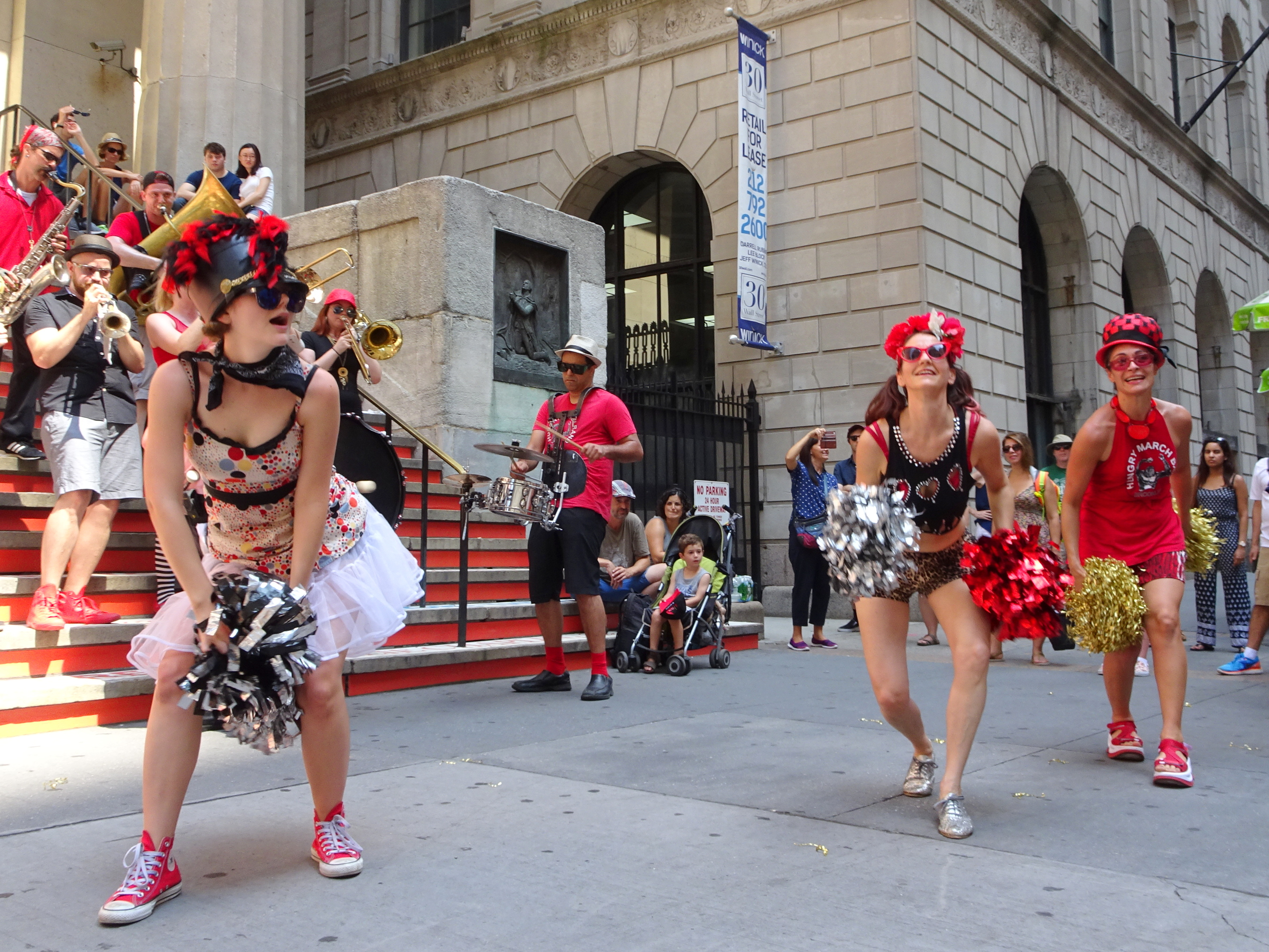
Federal Hall National Memorial, Manhattan

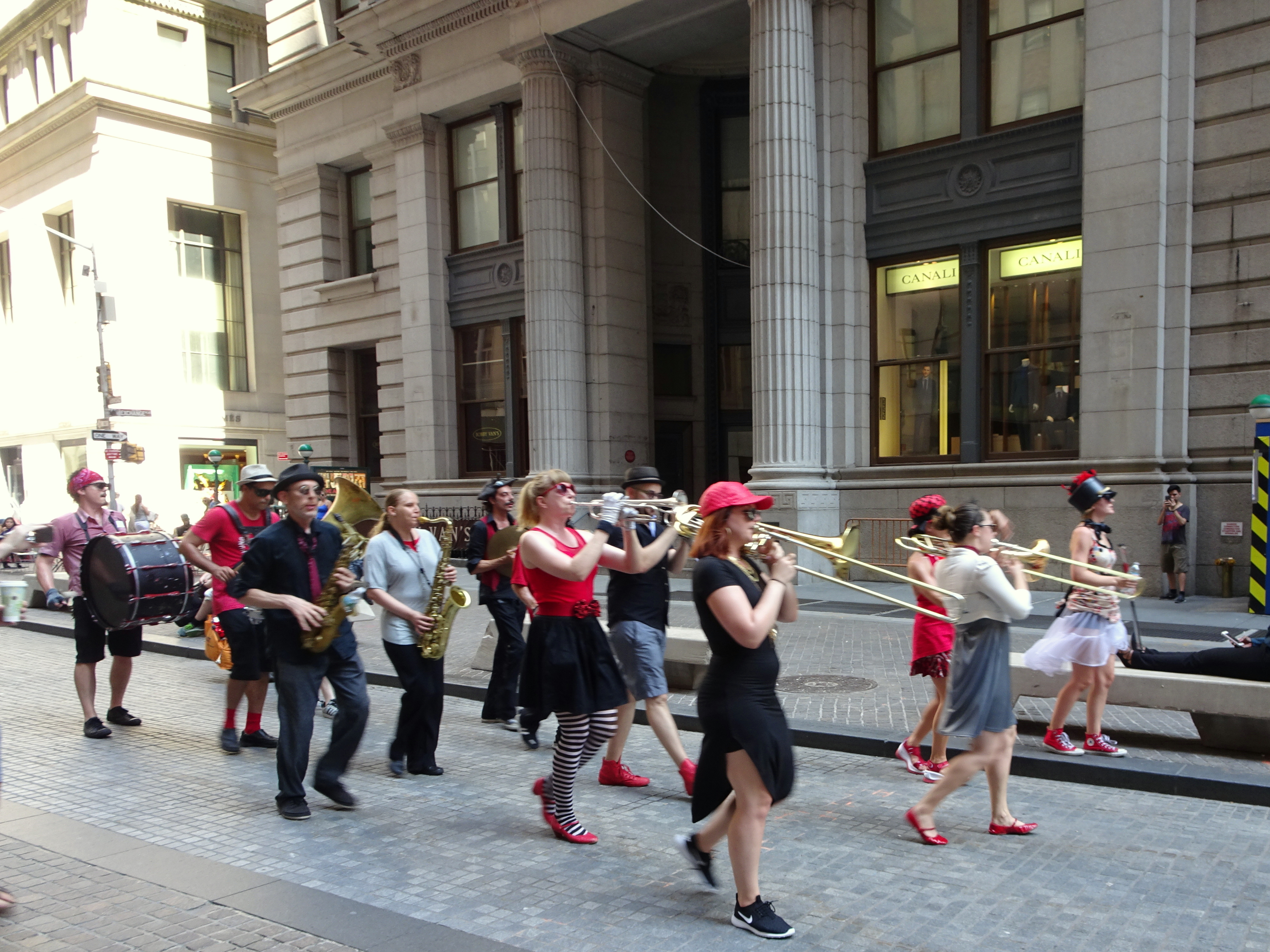
Broad Street, Manhattan

The Hungry March Band is an American brass band with approximately 15-20 active musicians and performers. In performance, the group's size can vary from five to fifty: from a quintet to a large corps of musicians, dancers, baton twirlers, and hula hoopers.

HMB has a repertoire of originals and traditionals that borrows from global brass band traditions, including Balkan Gypsy music, Indian wedding bands, and New Orleans second line. The band also references punk rock; techno, hip hop; various jazz traditions, including free jazz and bop; reggae; and chance music. They cite Sun Ra, Charlie Parker, John Cage, the Shyam Brass Band, Fanfare Ciocărlia, Rebirth Brass Band, The Skatalites, Sonic Youth, "Weird Al" Yankovic, and Black Sabbath as influences.

== History ==
The Hungry March Band was formed in 1997 at the Happy Birthday Hideout for the purpose of performing in the Coney Island Mermaid Parade. Some early members were Scott Moore on sousaphone, Cuzn Johnny, Dreiky Caprice, Tim Hoey, Darius 'Boom Boom' Macrum, Noah on percussion, Theresa Westerdahl aka Tara Fire Ball on clarinet, Gam Mitkevich on trombone, and Sara Valentine as baton twirler. Sasha Sumner, Sebastian Isler, Atsushi Tsamura, Emily Fairey, Okkon Tomohiko, Greg Squared, Ben Meyers, and Jason Candler all joined the band during the early period, before 2001.

== Performances ==
Part of the attraction for band members, spectators, and participants alike is the band's ability to move anywhere relatively quickly without need of electricity or artificial amplification. They have attracted attention with performances in unlikely locations, including subway trains, the Staten Island Ferry, and unannounced street events. They have also played numerous outdoor festivals in New York and around Europe, various protest marches, at Rubulad and Gemini & Scorpio events in Brooklyn, and annually in Boston, Massachusetts (and Providence, RI) at the HONK! Festival in Somerville, Massachusetts. Around New York City, they have performed at Lincoln Center and countless clubs throughout the five boroughs.

Notable gigs and tours:

- 2000: Madison Square Garden during one of Ralph Nader's rallies during his 2000 bid for the presidency of the United States which included a march to the steps of the main branch of the USPS to deliver voter registrations.
- 2000: 24-Hour Tom Waits Festival near Poughkeepsie, New York
- 2001: Mummers Parade in Philadelphia, Pennsylvania
- 2004: Summer European Tour (Italy, Germany, Switzerland, Netherlands)
- 2005: Mardi Gras, New Orleans, Louisiana
- 2005: Summer European Tour (Italy, France)
- 2006: Summer European Tour (Germany, Italy)
- 2007: Summer European Tour (Germany, Spain, France)
- 2009: Summer Tour in France, Sant'Anna Arresi Jazz Festival, Sardinia, Italy
- In 2010, their concert from the 2009 Sant'Anna Arresi Jazz Festival in Sardinia was broadcast on Radio3 throughout Italy.
  On May 27, 2010, their performance of Conduction No. 188 under the baton of Butch Morris was also broadcast nationally throughout Italy.
- 2010: West coast US Tour
- 2010: Lovefest Saylorsburg, PA
- 2012: XIII Festival Iberioamericano de Teatro, Bogota, Colombia
- 2015: Summer European Tour (England, France)
- 2016: Le Festif de Baie-St-Paul, Québec, Canada

The band also makes an appearance in John Cameron Mitchell's 2006 movie Shortbus.

== Discography ==
Studio albums

- Running Through with the Sadness (2018)
- Live at the Sant'Anna Arresi Jazz Festival (2009)
- Portable Soundtracks for Temporary Utopias (2007)
- Critical Brass (2005)
- On the Waterfront (2002)
- Hungry March Band Official Bootleg (2000)

EPs

- Mali Mali / Le Baulois (2014)
- Suspicious Package (Roll Out the Poncho) EP (2008)

=== Running Through with the Sadness ===
Recorded over the course of four years, this album was produced and recorded by HMB member Jason Candler. It is composed entirely of original material written by band members, the cover art is by HMB member John Heyenga, and is the first album by HMB to be released on LP format. Basis tracks were recorded at Galapagos Art Space in DUMBO, Brooklyn, and the rest of the production was handled at the Maid's Room, Lower East Side.

=== Portable Soundtracks for Temporary Utopias ===
Recorded in March 2007 at The Hook in Red Hook, Brooklyn, this CD was produced by Danny Blume, Matt Moran and the Hungry March Band, and mastered by Scott Hull. HMB member Jason Candler provided additional production. It almost exclusively comprises original material written by band members, and the cover art is by Samantha Tsistinas with design work by Julie Hair, both of whom are percussionists in the band.

=== Critical Brass ===
This CD was recorded at LOHO Studios on Clinton Street on Manhattan's Lower East Side a few weeks after the Hungry March Band returned from its first European tour. In a similar style to On the Waterfront, the entire thing was recorded live, but this time with many well-placed microphones, and in a more controlled sound environment. It was produced by Jason Candler and the Hungry March Band, recorded by Joe Hogan, and contains cover art by Troy Frantz.

=== On the Waterfront ===
On the Waterfront was recorded in two sessions in 2001 with the entire band playing live into two microphones (one for the bass drum and one for the band at large). It was recorded in a loft apartment in Williamsburg, Brooklyn by John Gurrin and edited by HMB member Jason Candler. The cover art is by East Village artist Fly. This disc is named after and dedicated to the vacant lot on the East River in Brooklyn where the band used to rehearse and to which it attributes its miraculous rebirth.

=== Official Bootleg ===
The first Hungry March Band CD is a fairly accurate reflection of what the band was doing for the first few years of its existence. Several tracks were recorded at the now-defunct Rubulad art space in Williamsburg, Brooklyn in the fall of 1999, but most of them were culled from field recordings made by band members. The opening track, Disco Bhangra, was recorded at the Ship's Mast bar on Kent Avenue.

Most of the material was improvised based on loose structural ideas that were conceived by sousaphonist Scott Moore, and designed to allow for maximum improvisation and spontaneity. The CD arrangement was completed by Ben Meyers & Scott Moore.

== Related performance projects ==
The following is an incomplete list of other musical and theatrical projects that involve or have involved members of the Hungry March Band:

Ram Umbus (Scott Moore, John Lewis)
Crash Worship (Dreiky Caprice)
Nimble One Minded Animals Here (Scott Moore)
Sink Manhattan (Scott Moore)
THRUST (Tara Fire Ball)
Tung Fa Lupa (Tara Fire Ball, Tim Hoey)
Female Bureau of Investigation (Sasha Sumner)
Live Skull (Julie Hair, Rich Hutchins)
Of Cabbages and Kings (Rich Hutchins)
Digitalis (Julie Hair, Rich Hutchins)
Ruin... (Rich Hutchins)
3 Teens Kill 4 (Julie Hair)
Bite Like A Kitty (Julie Hair)
Guarsh (Jason Candler)
The University of Iowa Hawkeye Marching Band (John Barker)
The Bleeding Reeds (Emily Fairey, Greg Squared, Jason Candler, Okkon Yokoyama)
The Bindlestiff Family Cirkus (Ben Meyers, Tim Hoey, Kris Anton)
Torch Job (Samantha Tsistinas, Tara Fire Ball)
Scorchers (Dee Jay Mush One, Ben Shanley)
Fireproof (Ben Shanley, Anders Nelson, Dee Jay Mush One)
Circus Amok (Ben Meyers)
Little Miss Big Mouth (Sara Valentine, Rich Hutchins)
Neues Kabarett (Urania Mylonas)
Juliet Echo (Jen Emma, Rich Hutchins)
Jollyship the Whiz-Bang (Tim Hoey, Kris Anton)
Reverend Billy and the Church of Stop Shopping (Sasha Sumner, Urania Mylonas)
Gary Lucas & Gods and Monsters (Jason Candler)
Earth People (Jason Candler)
Gelcaps/Millbrook Falls/The Lids (Doug Anson, Gam)
Guitar Trips (Doug Anson)
Doug Douglas and the Road Agents (Doug Anson)
The Woes (Joe Keady)
Zagnuts Cirkus Orchestra (Greg Squared)
Rude Mechanical Orchestra (Michele Hardesty, Joe Keady, Ben Meyers, Rich Hutchins, Quince Marcum, Julie Hair, Jean Loscalzo)
Veveritse (JR Hankins, Don Godwin, Joe Keady, Greg Squared, Emily Geller, Quince Marcum, Sarah Ibrahim)
Stagger Back Brass Band (Michele Hardesty, Quince Marcum, Joe Keady, Don Godwin, Greg Squared, JR Hankins)
The Red Hook Ramblers (Joe Keady)
Squeezebox (Joe Keady)
Phideaux (Rich Hutchins, Julie Hair)
Lubricated Goat (Rich Hutchins)
Minor Mishap Marching Band (Adam Loudermilk)
O'Death (David Rogers-Berry)
Raya Brass Band (Greg Squared, Don Godwin)
