= Carnaval (2024 film) =

- Theatrical release poster
- Directed by: Gabriel Tejada; José Osorio
- Written by: Gabriel Tejada; José Osorio
- Cinematography: Luis Enrique Tirado
- Production company: Asociación Cultural Indio Pishgo
- Release date: February 1, 2024
- Running time: 75 minutes
- Country: Peru
- Language: Spanish

Carnaval is a 2024 Peruvian documentary film written and directed by Gabriel Tejada and José Osorio. It reviews the history of the Cajamarca festival from its origins to the present day and whose gastronomy, music and characters unite an entire town. It premiered on February 1, 2024, in Cajamarca theaters.

== Synopsis ==
Before Lent is Carnival, the time when everyone can do whatever they want. This documentary narrated by a generation of carnival-goers along with archival material from 50 years ago, portrays the party full of music, food, drink and color that currently unites an entire town; people who later repent of their sins.

== Production ==
=== Financing ===
The film received a financial incentive of S/312,000 soles after winning the 2022 National Documentary Project Competition of the Directorate of Audiovisuals, Phonography and New Media of the Ministry of Culture to begin filming.

=== Filming ===
Principal photography began on February 10, 2022, and wrapped in early March of the same year in Cajamarca, Peru.

== Accolades ==
Year	Award / Festival	Category	Recipient	Result	Ref.
2024	11th Trujillo Film Festival	APRECI Jury Awards - Special Mention	Carnaval	Won	
