= L Train Brass Band =

Brass band from Brooklyn, New York

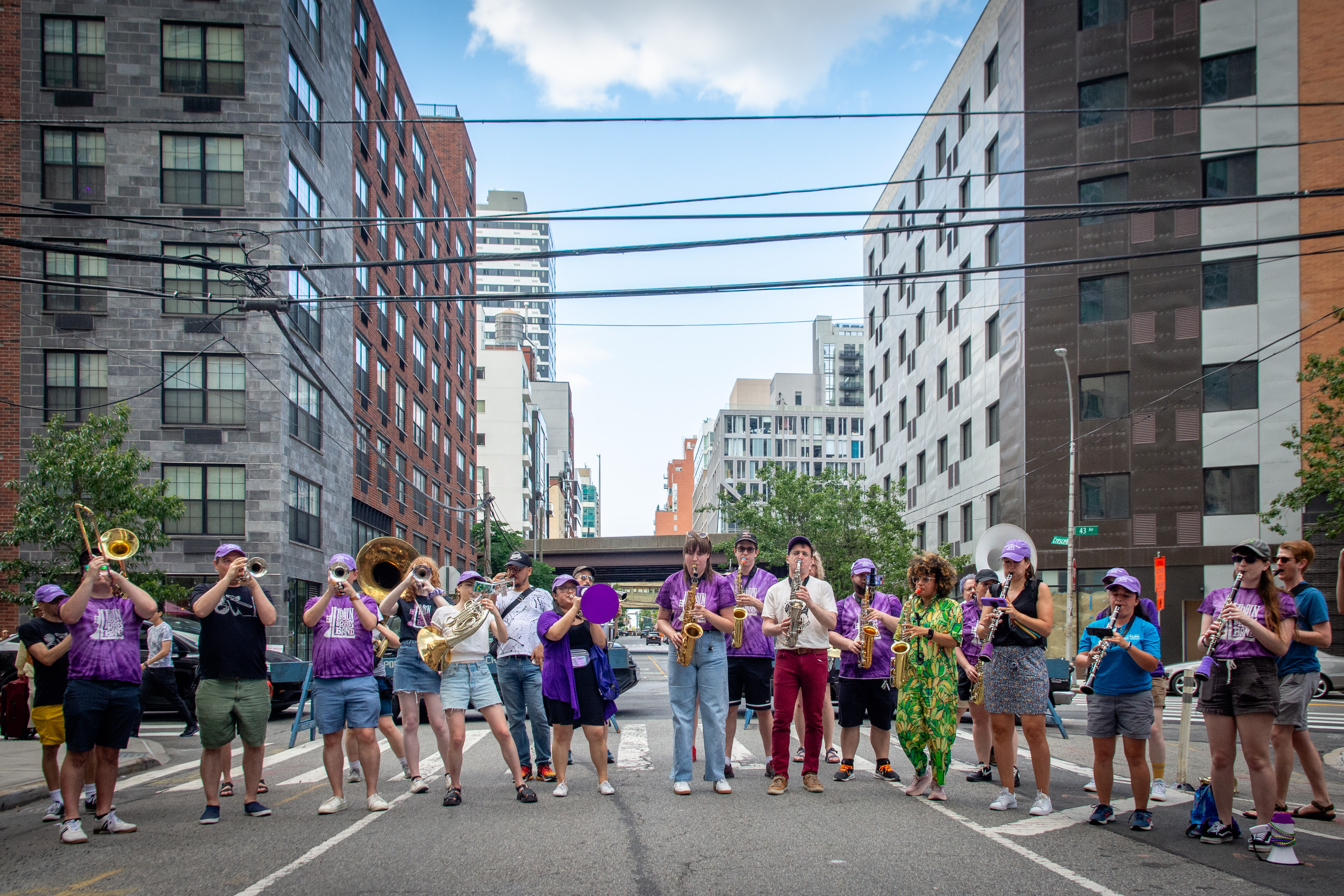
L Train Brass Band performing in NYC

The L Train Brass Band is a large non-profit community adult music organization based in Brooklyn, NY. Founded in 2017, the L Train Brass Band is composed of close to 100 brass, reed, and percussion musicians based in New York City. The band plays Mardi Gras/New Orleans music in addition to rhythm and blues, hip-hop, and pop covers, as well as a handful of original songs. They are currently artists in residence at Culture Lab LIC.

== Background ==
The L Train Brass Band was founded in 2017 by Ryan Hall and David Joseph. The band was named after the L subway line that many early members utilized to travel to and from rehearsal. When the band became too large to rehearse in a basement, they moved outside, which prompted locals to invite them to increasingly larger events. They made their first major public appearance in June 2017 when they marched in the Coney Island Mermaid Parade.

== Notable Appearances and Events ==
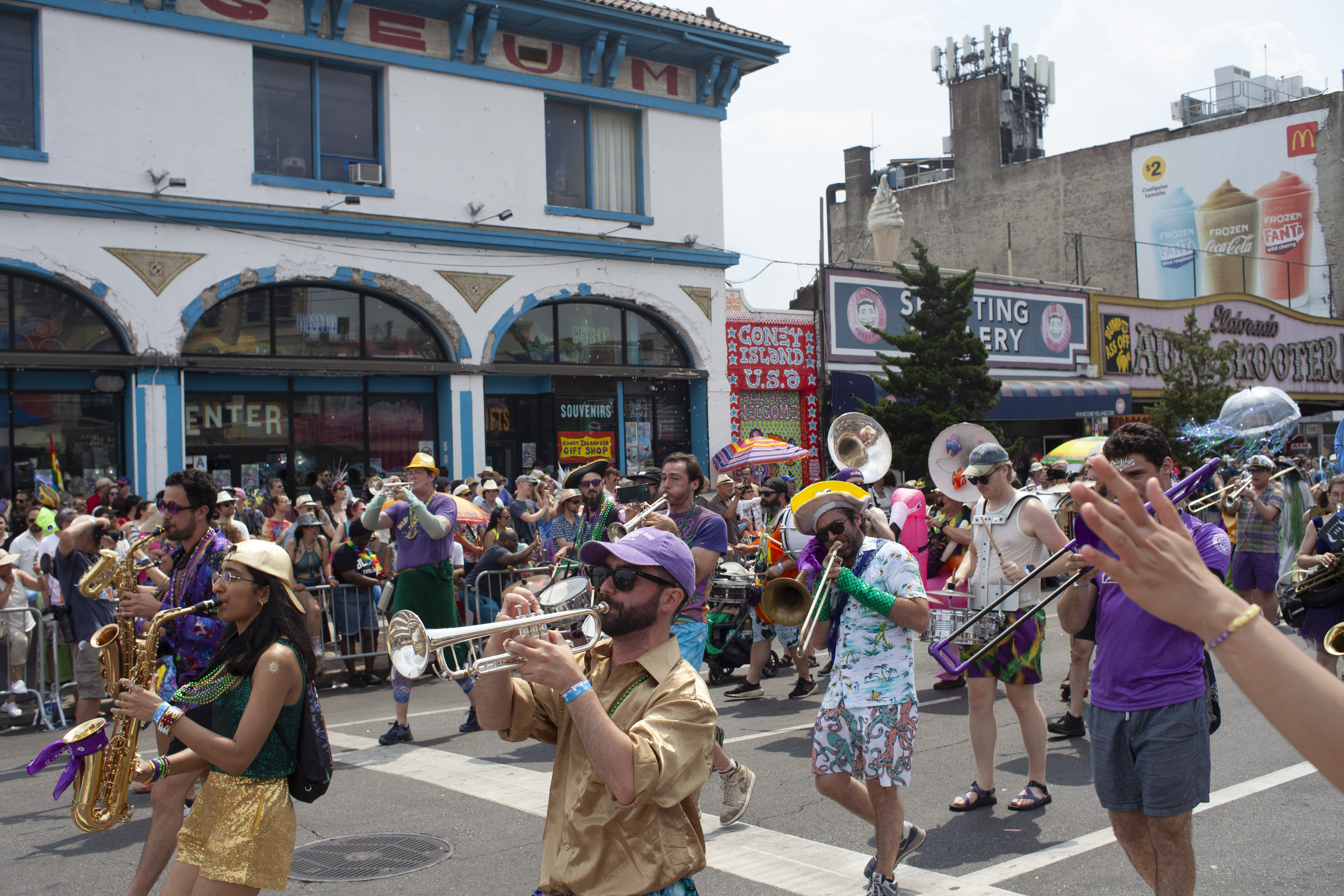
L Train Brass Band in the 2024 Coney Island Mermaid Parade

The L Train Brass Band has performed at many high-profile events, including the Governors Ball Music Festival and the Debt Gala, a Met Gala alternative raising money to reduce debt. The group has made several trips to New Orleans, Louisiana, where they have performed as part of the Krewedelusion and Krewe Boheme parades. In 2026, they played on the iconic steps of the Metropolitan Museum of Art as part of the Museum Mile Festival.

They have appeared in every Coney Island Mermaid Parade since 2017, where they have won several awards and have been cited as a parade favorite. The band appears in the 2022 Apple TV Documentary "End of the Line."

The L Train Brass Band has run and operated a New York City-based brass music festival called Brasswick since 2019. The event provides the community access to a variety of local bands and vendors.
