= Zelda (band) =

Japanese rock band

- Origin: Japan
- Genres: New wave, post-punk, gothic rock, pop rock, glam rock, progressive rock, reggae, avant-garde
- Years active: 1979 – 1996
- Labels: Nippon Phonogram; Sony Music Entertainment; Cutting Edge
- Members: Sachiho Kojima (bass); Sayoko Takahashi (vocals); Ako Ozawa (drums); Fukie Ishihara (guitar 1983-90); Naomi Motomura (guitar 1991-96)
- Past members: Yōko Suzuki (guitar); Kuniko "Maru" Nozawa (drums)

Zelda (ゼルダ), stylized as ZELDA, was a Japanese rock band active in the 1980s and 1990s. They played a pioneering role as one of Japan's first all-girl bands.

Led by Sachiho Kojima (小嶋さちほ), the band covered an impressive range of musical genres, from new wave, punk, pop, post-punk, and later, reggae. Zelda played a seminal role for later bands with their forays into roots music and experimental sounds.

== History ==
- 1980: Sayoko Takahashi (高橋佐代子) joins as vocalist at age 15.
- 1982: The band have their major debut on 25 August with the simultaneous release of their first album ZELDA and the single Mirage Lover through Nippon Phonogram (later Mercury Music Entertainment, now absorbed by Universal Music KK). The band lineup at the time is: Kojima, Takahashi, Yōko Suzuki (鈴木洋子, guitar) and Kuniko Nozawa (野沢久仁子, drums).
- 1983: Fukie Ishihara (石原富紀江) takes over as guitarist. Ako Ozawa (小沢亜子) becomes the band's drummer.
- 1984: Kojima and Takahashi form side project Maneki-neko Kagekidan (招き猫カゲキ団), releasing the album Dai-ichi Kakyoku-shū (第一歌曲集) in September.
- 1985: Zelda moves to CBS Sony (Sony Music Entertainment).
- 1986: Zelda appears in the movie The New Dawn of Billy the Kid (ビリー・ザ・キッドの新しい夜明け).
- 1990: Ishihara leaves the band. Zelda takes a one-year break, during which time they move to the cutting edge label (avex).
- 1991: Naomi Motomura (本村直美) joins as guitarist.
- 1996: Zelda disbands.

== Members ==
- Sachiho Kojima, born 26 December 1958, bass and band leader. Later married to Bo Gumbo's vocalist Donto (deceased).
- Sayoko Takahashi, born 10 October 1964, vocals.
- Yōko Suzuki, guitar (prior to 1983).
- Fukie Ishihara, born 23 December 1960, guitar (1983–90).
- Naomi Motomura, guitar (1991–96).
- Kuniko Nozawa, nickname "Maru", drums (prior to 1983).
- Ako Ozawa, born 16 February 1963, drums (1983–96).

== Discography ==
=== Singles ===
From Junk Connection

- ZELDA EP (10 October 1980)

From Aspirin Record

- ZELDA & Mr. $$$ (January 1981) flexi disc

From Nippon Phonogram

- Mirage Lover (ミラージュ・ラヴァー) (25 August 1982)

From CBS Sony

- Mizuumi no STEP / STEP ON THE LAKE (湖のステップ / STEP ON THE LAKE) (1985) 12" promo single
- Ōgon no toki (黄金の時間) (21 May 1986) 12" single
- Electric Sweetie (1 April 1987) one side single

From Cutting Edge (under sales arrangement with Toshiba EMI)

- MY LITTLE CRYING (1 October 1992)
- LOVE LIVE LIFE (21 April 1993)
- Tsumetaku shinaide (冷たくしないで) (21 October 1993)
- Anata dake ga subete ja nai (あなただけがすべてじゃない) (8 November 1995)
- Kanashikute (かなしくて) (27 March 1996)
- Kinmokusei (金木犀) (9 October 1996)

=== Albums ===
From Nippon Phonogram

- ZELDA (25 August 1982)
- CARNAVAL (5 November 1983)

From CBS Sony

- Sora-iro Bōshi no Hi (空色帽子の日) (21 October 1985)
- C-ROCK WORK (1 April 1987)
- Dancing Days (22 June 1988) live album + Ōgon no Toki
- SHOUT SISTER SHOUT (21 October 1988)
- D.R.O.P. (21 September 1989)

From Cutting Edge

- LOVE LIVE LIFE (21 October 1992)
- FULLMOON PUJAH (21 October 1993)
- Niji-iro no Awa (虹色のあわ) (2 May 1996)

From Alfa Records

- JAHPANG STYLEE - LOVE LIVE LIFE MIX (21 April 1993) remix album

From Sony Music House Inc.

- GOLDEN☆BEST / ZELDA - time spiral (19 March 2003) 2 CD compilation.

=== Original soundtrack ===
From CBS Sony

- TO-Y - Original Image Album (「TO―Y」オリジナル・イメージ・アルバム) (1 October 1987) with the song Tokei jikake no setsuna (時計仕掛けのせつな)

=== Videos ===
- Dancing Days (1988, CBS Sony)
- LOVE LIVE LIFE (10 September 1992, featuring Nissin Power Station live footage)
- FULLMOON PUJAH (1993)

=== Books ===
- Otome no rock dango (乙女のロックだんご) (10 January 1986, Sachiho Kojima and Miyuki Shinbo, MUSIC MAGAZINE)
- ZELDA monogatari (ZELDA物語) (10 December 1988, Eiko Fujisawa, JICC Shuppankyoku)
