= Illuminares =

Annual lantern festival in east Vancouver, Canada

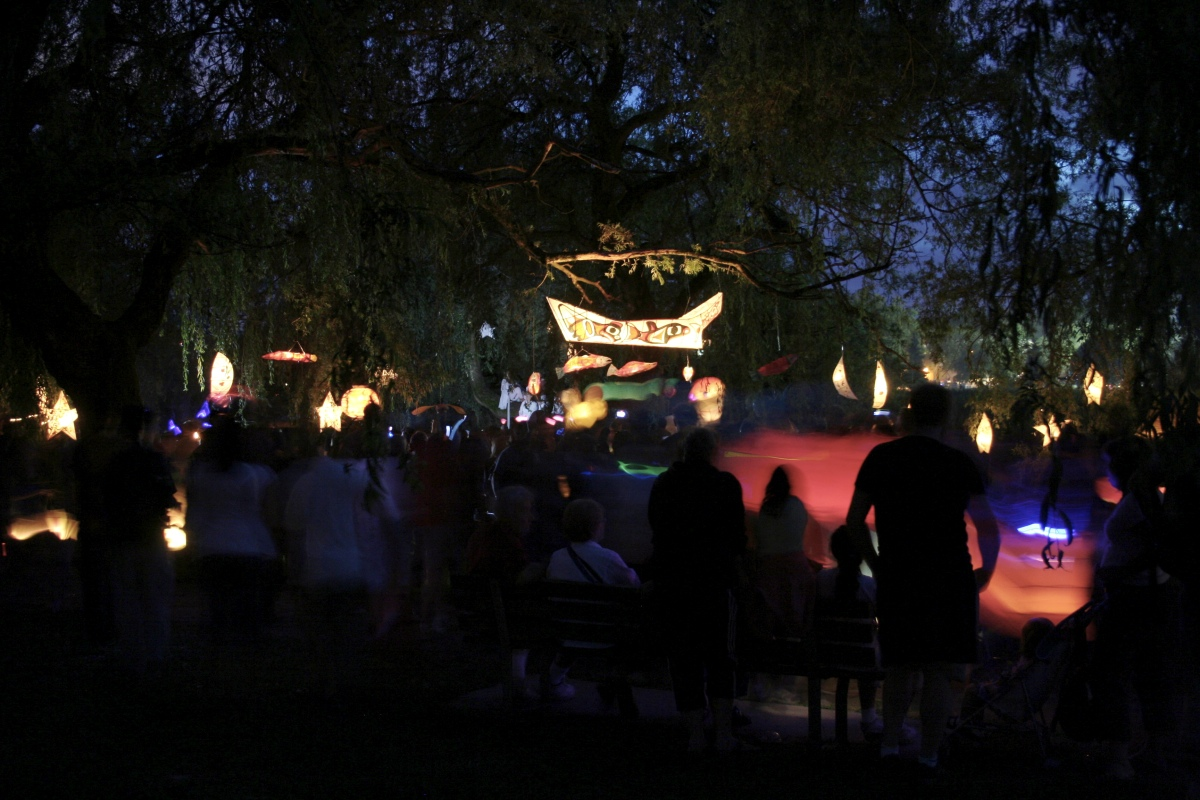
Lantern installations at Illuminares, 2007.

Illuminares is an annual lantern festival formerly held every summer in John Hendry Park (also known colloquially Trout Lake Park) in east Vancouver.

The first festival took place in 1989. In 2010, it moved to Canada Place, them returned to John Hendry Park in 2012. It was produced by the Public Dreams Society, a group formed in 1985 to encourage community participation in creativity. A nighttime event, it featured street performers such as fire-breathers, jugglers and bands. Local artists conducted lantern-making workshops, and participants brought their own ornate homemade lanterns. The festival was financed through corporate and community sponsors, government grants, and donations from attendees.

Beginning as a small community festival, it quickly grew into one of Vancouver's most popular events. About 30,000 people attended each year.

Another local lantern festival, the North Shore's Wild Lights Lantern Festival, continues to be held in Edgemont Village.
