= Infernal Noise Brigade =

Musical and protest group based in Seattle, Washington, U.S.

The Infernal Noise Brigade was a Seattle, Washington-based musical group, who originally formed to participate in the 1999 Seattle WTO protests. Over its seven-year history, the group performed as part of several large-scale protest actions, such as those at the 2000 IMF/World Bank Meeting in Prague, the 2003 WTO Ministerial in Cancún, Mexico, and the 2004 Republican National Convention in New York City, as well as at numerous events in their homebase of Seattle. In July 2005, they participated in the protests against the 31st G8 summit in Scotland as part of a European tour that also brought them to England, Germany, the Netherlands, Belgium, and Austria.

Their website describes their music as combining "elements of drumline, taiko, Mughal and North African rhythms, elements of Balkan fanfares, breakbeats, and just about anything else." Although best known for their free (and often confrontational) public performances at political protests, they sometimes performed at more conventional concerts and club gigs, usually featured as part of a musically eclectic program.

Christopher Frizzelle, in an "obituary" for the band in the Seattle-based arts weekly The Stranger, remarked that their "most important and dramatic public events were standoffs with cops" and that they "can be credited for keeping WTO protestors energized, focused, and photogenic… What their parties and their protests had in common was intensity, vividness, and a fun, frightening sense that anything could happen. They were lessons in liberation."

Frizzelle, who travelled with INB on a portion of their European tour, wrote in his review of that tour that the members used "band names", partly to "retain the mystery of the band" and partly to preserve their anonymity from their employers: almost none of the band members are professional musicians. As example, Frizzelle provided the roster from the mainland portion of the European tour: "Annemat, Atomika, B. Q. (whose band name is Red Dot, but no one calls her that), Bluer Than You, Bookworm, Brassbelle, D. P. Punkass ("My whole name is Dread Pirate Punkass, but in print I like to be D. P. Punkass"), DK Pan, Flash, Grey Filastine, Hawtpantz, Ice Frog, In Phase, Megor, Mildred, Mr. Rose, the Professor, Ramon, Satsuma, Skunk, Spider, and Violet."

The Infernal Noise Brigade officially disbanded on July 29, 2006.

Members of Infernal Noise Brigade went on to form Titanium Sporkestra.

== Recordings ==
- Insurgent Selections for Battery & Voice
- Vamos a la Playa (live in Cancún), 2003
- "L'étincelle"/"Manguera" (single), 2004
- Final Report Volume 6
- Final Report, 2008
- Field Recordings Volume 7
- (with Filastine) No G8 Japan Action Benefit, 2008
- The Final Recordings 2009
