= Emanuel Carnevali =

Italian-American writer

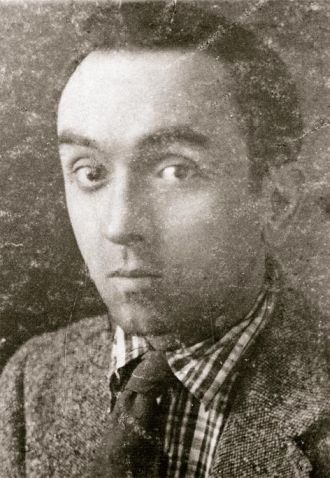
Undated photo portrait of Emanuel Carnevali

Emanuel Carnevali (4 December 1897 - 11 January 1942) was an Italian-American writer. His body of work includes poetry, literary criticism, autobiography, and other prose writings.

== Life ==
Manuel Federico Carlo Carnevali was born in Florence on 4 December 1897 at 11 via Montebello. His father was Tullio Carnevali (Lugo di Romagna, 1869), accountant-chief of the prefecture, and his mother was Matilde Piano (Turin, 1873). Emanuel, Em or Manolo, as he was called, was born after his parents had separated. After a childhood spent in Pistoia, Biella and Cossato and after the death of his mother (1908), his father enrolled him in a boarding school after remarrying and going to live with his new family in Bologna. In 1911, Emanuel won a scholarship from the Marco Foscarini College of Venice and spent almost two years there before being expelled. In 1913, he entered the Pier Crescenzi Technical Institute in Bologna, where he was a pupil of the literary critic and writer Adolfo Albertazzi. As he relates in his autobiography, due to frequent quarrels with his father, whom he considered authoritarian and reactionary, he decided to emigrate to the United States in 1914 at only 16 years old. Emanuel left Genoa on Caserta on March 17, 1914, and arrived in New York on April 5.

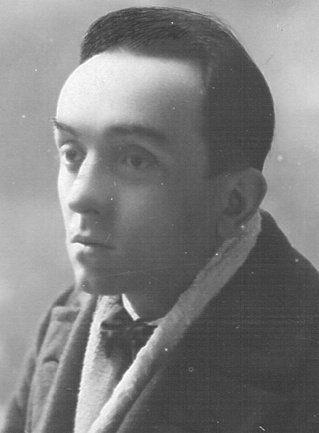
Undated photo portrait of Emanuel Carnevali

During the period 1914 to 1922, he lived between New York and Chicago while working odd jobs: dishwasher, grocery boy, waiter, snow shoveller, etc., and suffering from poverty and hunger. During this time, he also wrote original poetry in English and reviews of books and theatrical plays. His poems were published in various literary journals, including Poetry Magazine, founded in 1912 and directed by Harriet Monroe. For a short time, Carnevali served there in the role of editor. During these years, he also became friends with several poets, including Max Eastman, Ezra Pound, Robert McAlmon, and William Carlos Williams. In 1925 his works were collected in Tales of an hurried man (1925).

Suffering the effects of chronic syphilis and encephalitis lethargica, in 1922 he returned to Italy, where he lived for the last twenty years between the hospital and various pensions in Bazzano, the Policlinico of Rome and the Villa Baruzziana clinic in Bologna, where he continued to write in English. He died on 11 January 1942 in the Neurological Clinic of Bologna, after choking on a piece of bread. He was buried two days later in Bologna in the Certosa cemetery.

== Works ==
Carnevali published widely in the literary journals of the 1920s and 1930s, and this is where the bulk of his work exists. In 1925, a selection of his works was published under the title A Hurried Man by Robert McAlmon's Contact Editions, based in Paris. This volume collects about a quarter or a third of his published works.

In 1967, The Autobiography of Emanuel Carnevali was edited by Carnevali's friend Kay Boyle and published by Horizon Press. Carnevali's autobiography was also later published in Italian under the title Il primo dio, edited and translated by his half-sister Maria Pia Carnevali. The books differ somewhat as to the selection and arrangement of material.

Carnevali's letters to Benedetto Croce and Giovanni Papini are published under the title Voglio disturbare l’America (1980), edited by Gabriel Cacho Millet. Millet also collected Carnevali's essays and reviews (Saggi e recensioni, 1994) and the Bazzanese Diary (Diario bazzanese e altre pagine, 1994).

In 2022, a two-volume edition of The Collected Works of Carnevali was published by Sublunary Editions. In addition to Carnevali's published works, the volume includes several dozen of Carnevali's letters to his literary friends and previously unpublished material from his notebooks.

== Reception and Significance ==
Several of Carnevali's literary associates have left fond remembrances and appreciations. These include: William Carlos Williams, who discusses Carnevali in his 1951 Autobiography; Edward Dahlberg, who discusses Carnevali in his essay "Beautiful Failures", and Kay Boyle, whose remembrance serves as a foreword to Carnevali's posthumously published autobiography, which she edited. The poet and critic Dana Gioia has said that Carnevali was "the first Italian writer to make a significant, if short-lived, impact on modern American poetry."

== Legacy ==
The Municipality of Bazzano, the Rocca dei Bentivoglio di Bazzano Foundation, and the Municipal Historical Archive of Bazzano have published I am a vagabond and I sow words from a pocket hole, edited by Aurelia Casagrande (2008). The Municipality of Bazzano preserves some of Carnevali's papers in their archive.

== Bibliography ==
A Hurried Man. Contact Editions, 1925.

The Autobiography of Emanuel Carnevali, ed. Kay Boyle. Horizon Press, 1967.

Fireflies. Cambridge, MA: San Souci Press, 1970.

Furnished rooms. Ed. Dennis Barone. New York: Bordighera Press, 2006.

Neuriade shorties. Chicago: Danaides Press, 2013.

Sorrow’s headquarters. Chicago: Danaides Press, 2014.

Some things: Selected poems, 1918-1931. Chicago: Danaides Press, 2017.

The day of summer. Chicago: Danaides Press, 2017.

The Collected Works of Emanuel Carnevali, Vol. I (Prose, Selected Letters) and II (Poetry, Criticism, Selected Translations). Sublunary Editions, 2022.
