= Melville =

Melville may refer to:

== Places ==
=== Antarctica ===
- Cape Melville (South Shetland Islands)
- Melville Glacier, Graham Land
- Melville Highlands, Laurie Island
- Melville Peak, King George Island
- Melville Point, Marie Byrd Land

=== Australia ===
- Cape Melville, Queensland
- City of Melville, Western Australia, the local government authority
- Electoral district of Melville, Western Australia
- Melville Bay, Northern Territory
- Melville Island (Northern Territory)
- Melville, Western Australia, a suburb of Perth

=== Canada ===
- Lake Melville, Newfoundland and Labrador
- Melville Cove, Halifax, in Halifax Harbour
- Melville (electoral district), Saskatchewan, a federal electoral district
- Melville Island (Northwest Territories and Nunavut)
- Melville Island (Nova Scotia), in Halifax Harbour
- Melville Island, a small island in the Discovery Islands, British Columbia
- Melville Island, a small island near Dundas Island, British Columbia
- Melville Island, on Saint-Maurice River, in Shawinigan, Mauricie, Quebec
- Melville Peninsula, Nunavut
- Melville (provincial electoral district), Saskatchewan
- Melville Sound, Nunavut
- Melville, a community within the town of Caledon, Ontario
- Melville, Pictou County, Nova Scotia
- Melville, Saskatchewan, a city
- Municipality of the County of Inverness

=== Greenland ===
- Cape Melville (Greenland) (Nallortup Nuua)
- Melville Bay, Greenland
- Melville Glacier (Greenland)
- Melville Land, Greenland
- Melville Monument (Greenland) (Usuussarsuaq)

=== South Africa ===
- Melville, Gauteng, a suburb of Johannesburg
- Melville, KwaZulu-Natal, a seaside village on the South Coast of KwaZulu-Natal

=== United States ===
- Melville (Surry, Virginia), a historic house
- Melville Township, Renville County, Minnesota
- Melville, Louisiana, a town
- Melville, Montana, an unincorporated community
- Melville, New York, a hamlet and census-designated place in the town of Huntington
- Melville, North Dakota, an unincorporated community
- Melville, Oregon, an unincorporated community
- Melville, Rhode Island, a village
- Melville, West Virginia, an unincorporated community

=== Elsewhere ===
- Melville (crater), on the planet Mercury
- Melville, New Zealand, a suburb of Hamilton

== People ==
- Melville (name), including lists of people with the surname, given name or pen name

== Ships ==
- HMAS Melville, a ship and a shore establishment of the Royal Australian Navy
- HMS Melville, three ships of the Royal Navy
- R/V Melville, an oceanographic research vessel
- USS Melville, two ships named in honor of George W. Melville

== Titles ==
- Earl of Melville, in the Peerage of Scotland
- Viscount Melville, in the Peerage of the United Kingdom

== Other uses ==
- Melville AFC, a former New Zealand football team, now part of Melville United AFC
- Melville (album), a 1991 album by the Rheostatics
- Melville Bridge Club, Edinburgh, Scotland
- Melville Corporation, a defunct American retail holding corporation
- Melville Productions, a film production company formed by actor Gregory Peck
- Melville Shoe Corporation, a defunct American corporation
- The Melville, a skyscraper in Vancouver, Canada

== See also ==
- Melville Castle, a mansion in Midlothian, Scotland
- Melville House, Fife, Scotland
- Mulville, a surname
