= Senator McDonnell =

Senator McDonnell may refer to:

- Alexander Ronald McDonnell (1901–1989), Montana State Senate
- Charles McDonnell (Montana politician) (1850–1928), Montana State Senate
- Frank McDonnell (Irish politician) (fl. 1980s), Senate of Ireland
- Howard McDonnell (1909–1992), Mississippi State Senate
- Mike McDonnell (born 1966), Nebraska State Senate

== See also ==
- Forrest C. Donnell (1884–1980), U.S. Senator from Missouri, 1945 to 1951
