= Charles McDonnell =

Charles McDonnell may refer to:

- Charles McDonnell (police officer) (1841–1888), American police captain in the New York City Police Department
- Charles McDonnell (Montana politician)(1850-1928), Montana State Senator
- Charles Edward McDonnell (1854–1921), American prelate of the Roman Catholic Church
- Charles James McDonnell (born 1928), American Roman Catholic titular bishop and U.S. Army officer
