= Alexander Ronald McDonnell =

Montana politician

Ron McDonnell
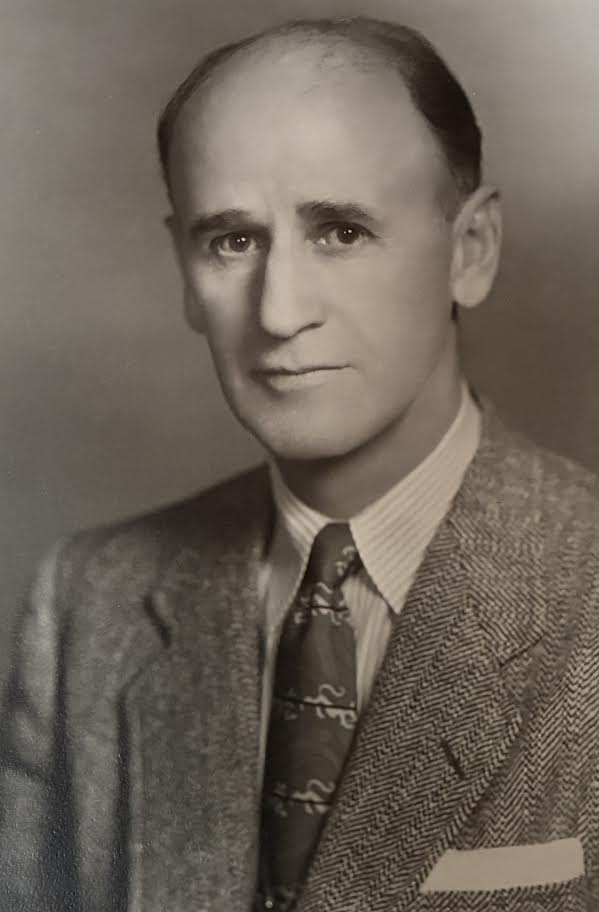
- Official Portrait, 1955

Member of the Montana Senate
- In office January 5, 1953 – January 6, 1969
- Preceded by: Leo J. Cremer
- Succeeded by: Jim Moore
Senate positions
Chair of the Banks and Banking Committee
In office
January 5, 1953 – January 3, 1957
Vice Chair of the Stock Growing and Grazing Committee
In office
January 5, 1953 – January 3, 1957
Vice Chair of the Printing Committee
In office
January 3, 1957 – January 7, 1959

Personal details
- Born: May 9, 1901 Melville, Montana
- Died: May 6, 1989 (aged 87) Big Timber, Montana
- Party: Republican
- Spouse: Ellen Rein (1941–1989)
- Children: 1
- Parent(s): Charles McDonnell, Elizabeth Feeley
- Education: University of Montana

Military service
- Branch/service: US Army (1942-1945)

Alexander Ronald "Ron" McDonnell (May 9, 1901 – May 6, 1989) or A. Ronald McDonnell was an American politician and banker. He was a Republican member of the Montana Legislature. He was elected to the Montana Senate in 1953 to represent Senate District 19, which at the time included Sweet Grass County and Park County. McDonnell served four consecutive terms as a Senator, retiring from the role in 1969. McDonnell also served as the Chairman of Citizens Bank & Trust Co, a bank which his father, Charles McDonnell had started.

== College athletics ==
McDonnell was on the University of Montana Grizzlies basketball team. He was placed into the University of Montana Hall of Fame after being named to the All-Northwest Team. He graduated with a degree in law. In 1921 McDonnell led the team in scoring against Gonzaga, winning the game 32-15 with 16 of points being scored by McDonnell. This led to his induction into the hall of fame.

== Political career ==
McDonnell was sworn in as a state senator in 1953, during the thirty-third legislative assembly. During this session, and some of his following sessions, he served alongside a future Governor of Montana, Donald Grant Nutter. In 1968 McDonnell opted not to seek re-election

=== Committees ===
During the thirty-third session McDonnell was named chairman of the banks and banking committee (1953–1957), vice chairman of the stock growing and grazing committee, and member of both the judiciary and printing committees.

In 1957 McDonnell was placed on the liquor control committee and remained on the banks and banking committee but was not named chairman. He was instead named vice chairman of the printing committee.

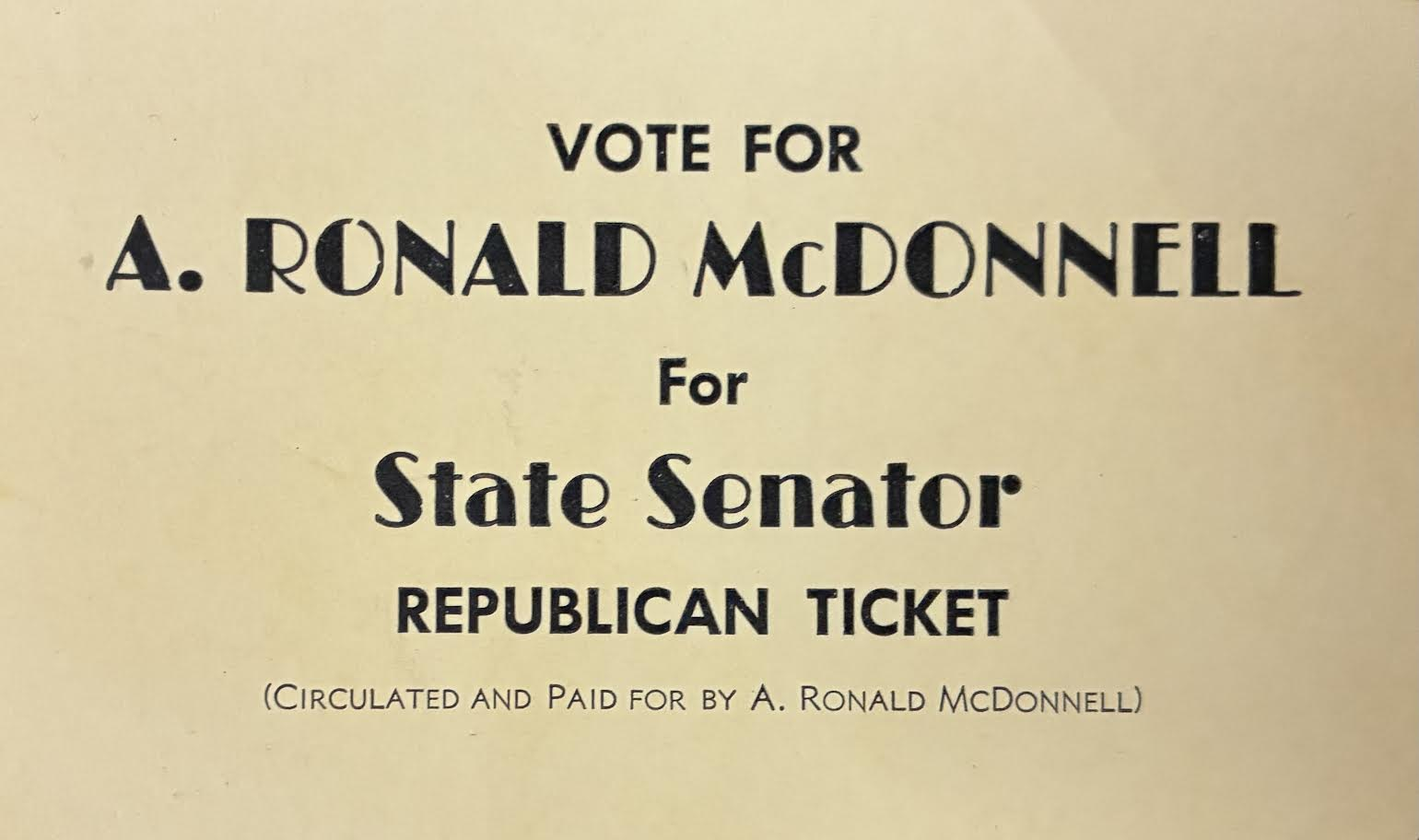
A McDonnell campaign card

In 1961 McDonnell was placed on the committee of constitutions, elections and federal relations. He remained on the judiciary committee while also being placed on the banking and insurance committee. That same year McDonnell was also offered the role of Senate Minority Leader, however he turned down the role. He stated that he did not want to vote for something just because it was made by a Republican, like it was expected by the Minority Leader, and instead he would vote for the bills he felt as though represented the people of Montana no matter the political affiliation.

During the 1963 session McDonnell was named to the rules committee and the committee on fish and game. He remained on the committee on banking and insurance.

For 1965 he remained on the committee on fish and game while returning to the judiciary committee.

== Personal life ==
McDonnell was born on May 9, 1901, to former Montana State Senator Charles McDonnell and his wife, Elizabeth. He had five siblings, Ann, Mary Belle, Edith, Evelyn, and Charlie.

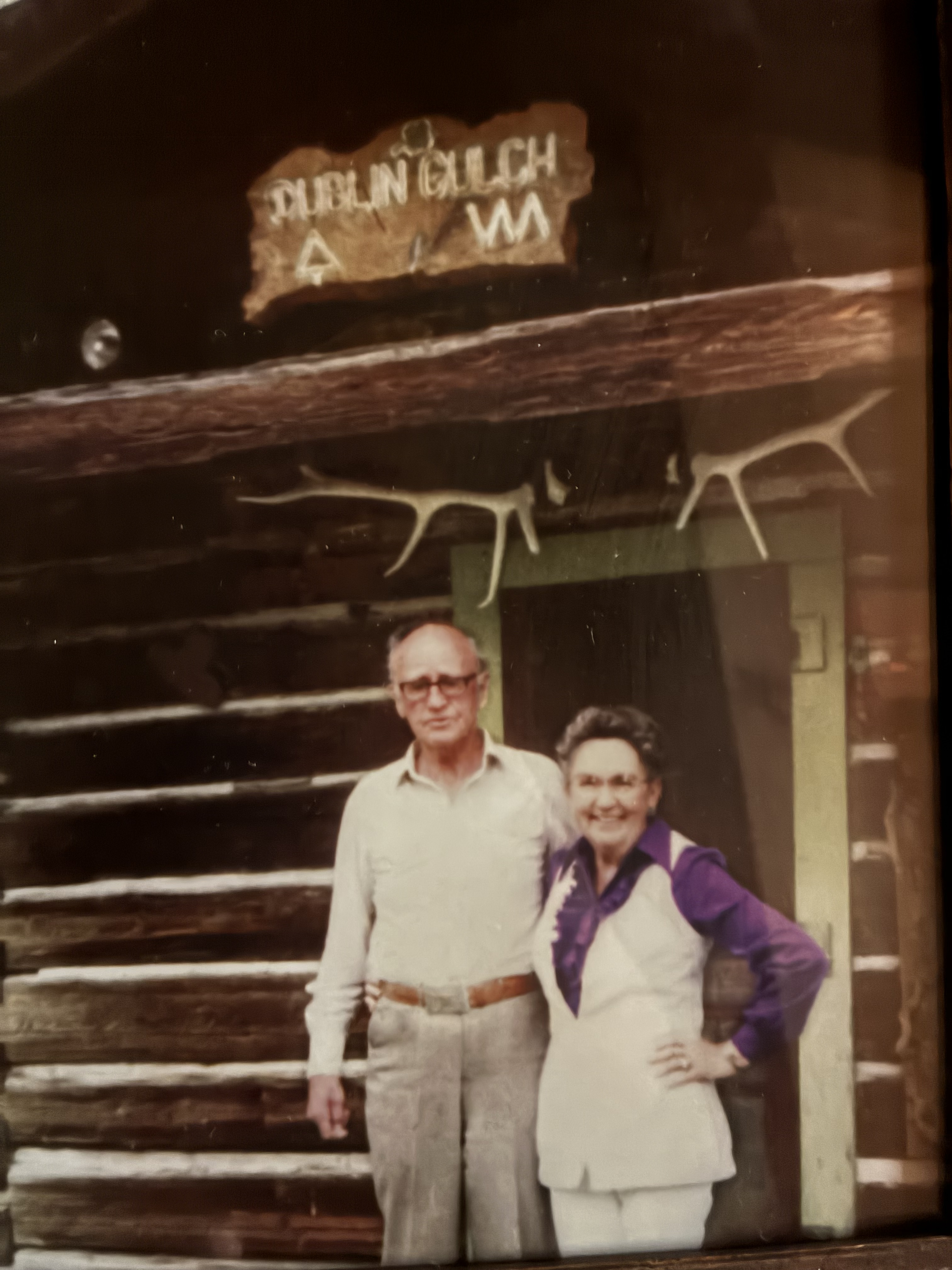
McDonnell and his wife Ellen in front of their cabin

McDonnell married Ellen Rein in 1941, and the two had one child, Mary Ellen "Mimi" McDonnell. Mimi is currently serving as the chair of Citizens Bank and Trust Co, following in her father's footsteps.

McDonnell lived at 402 McLeod St, a building built in 1890 that briefly served as the county's jail and stable. Charles McDonnell bought the house in the 1922 and the family owned the house until 2021. McDonnell was often found beside his brother, Charlie, who was the President of Citizens Bank & Trust Co.

== Death ==
In McDonnell's last few months of life he began suffering from alzheimers. McDonnell died on May 6, 1989, at the age of 87. McDonnell's death was covered in the Big Timber Pioneer and many people paid their respects at his funeral.

== Images ==
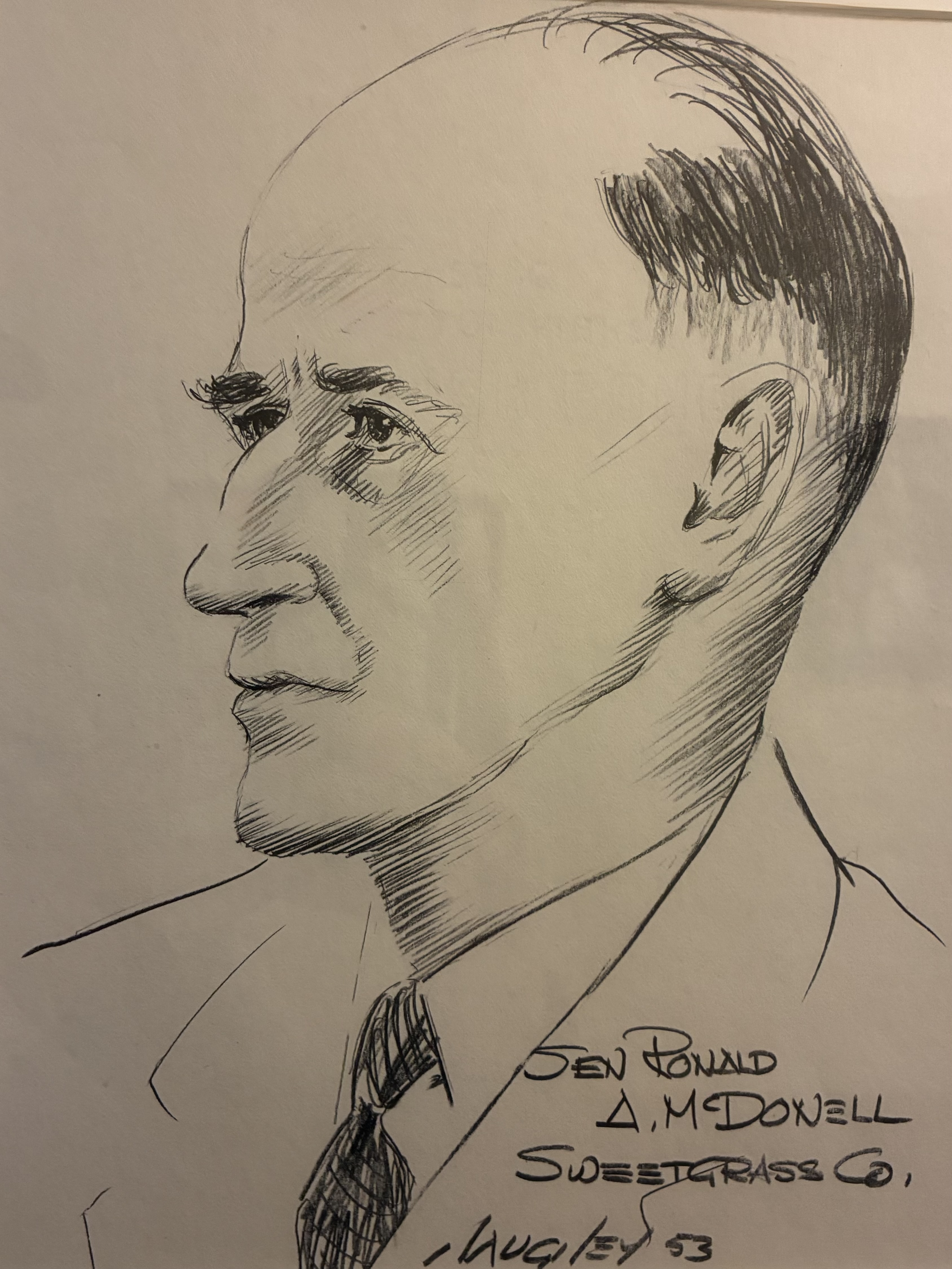
Drawing of Senator McDonnell, 1953

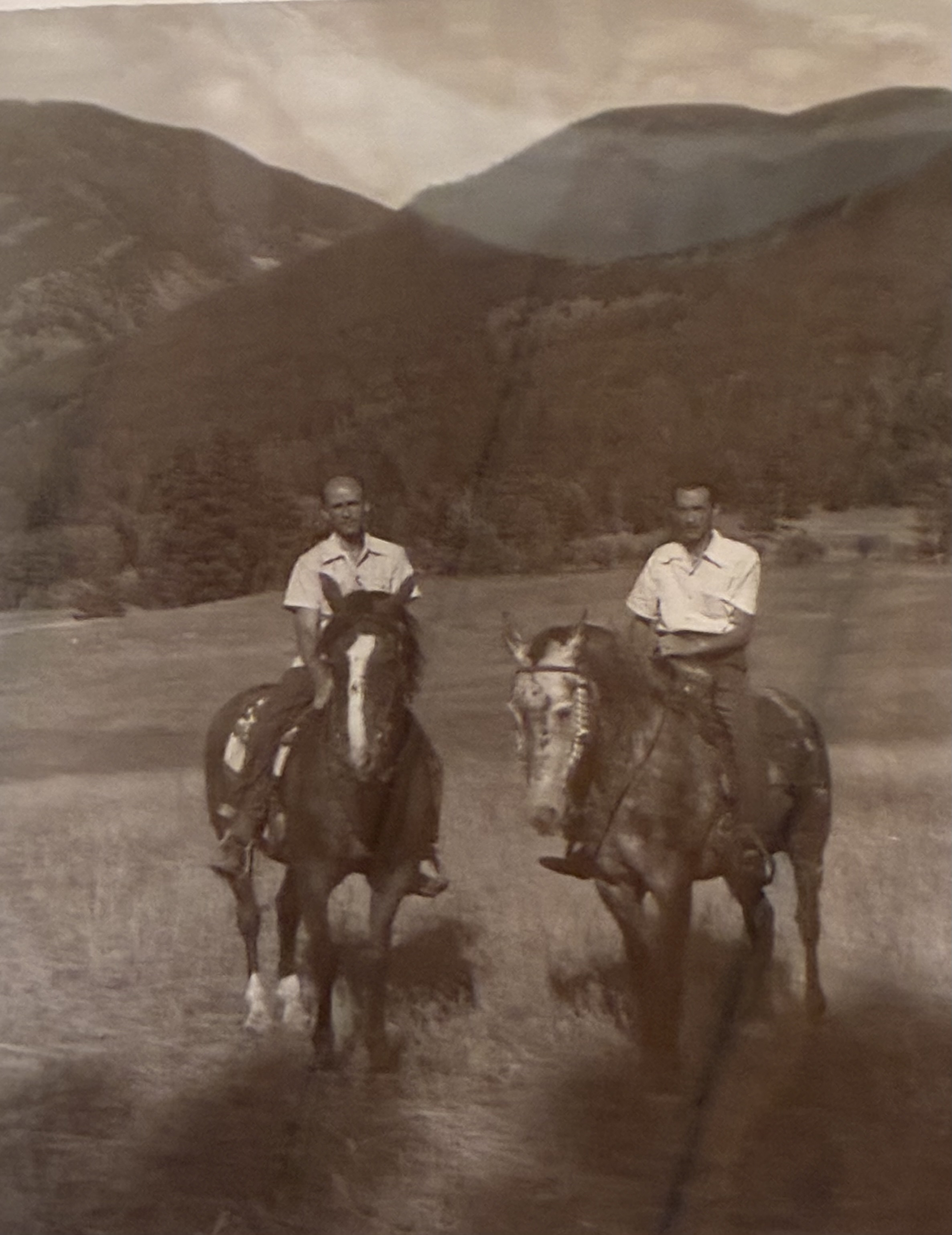
McDonnell with his brother Charlie

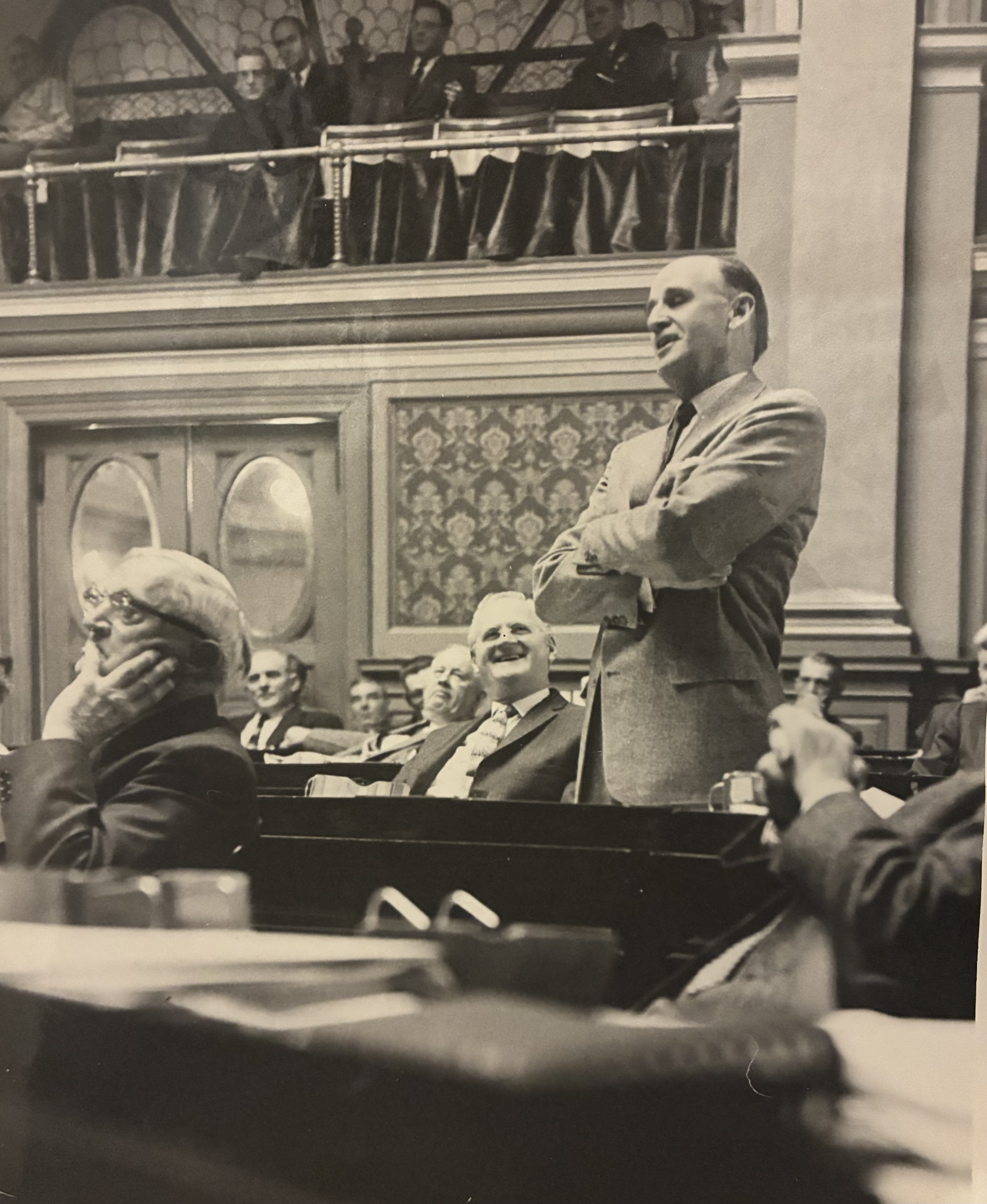
McDonnell speaking before the Montana Senate, 1965

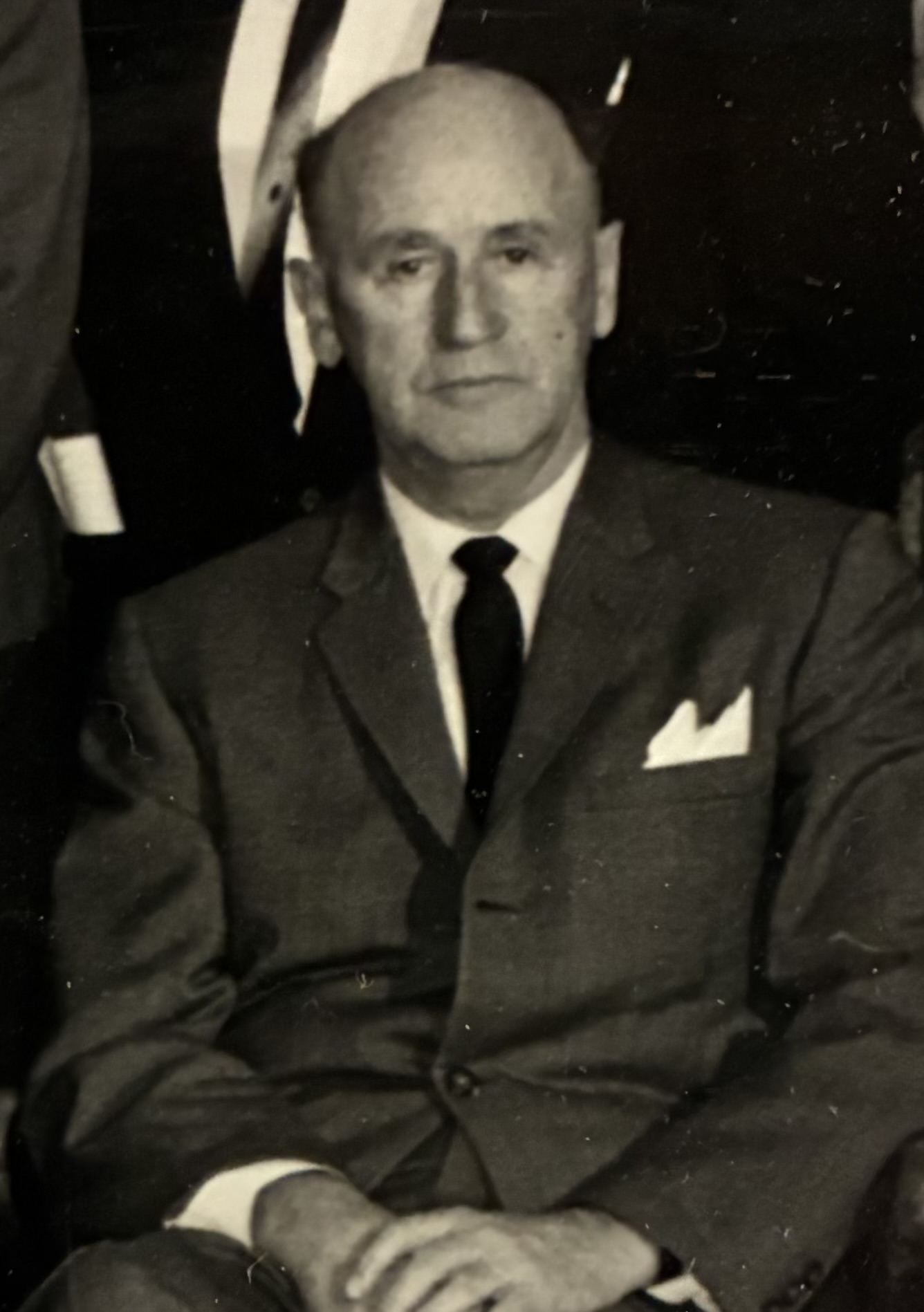
McDonnell in 1964

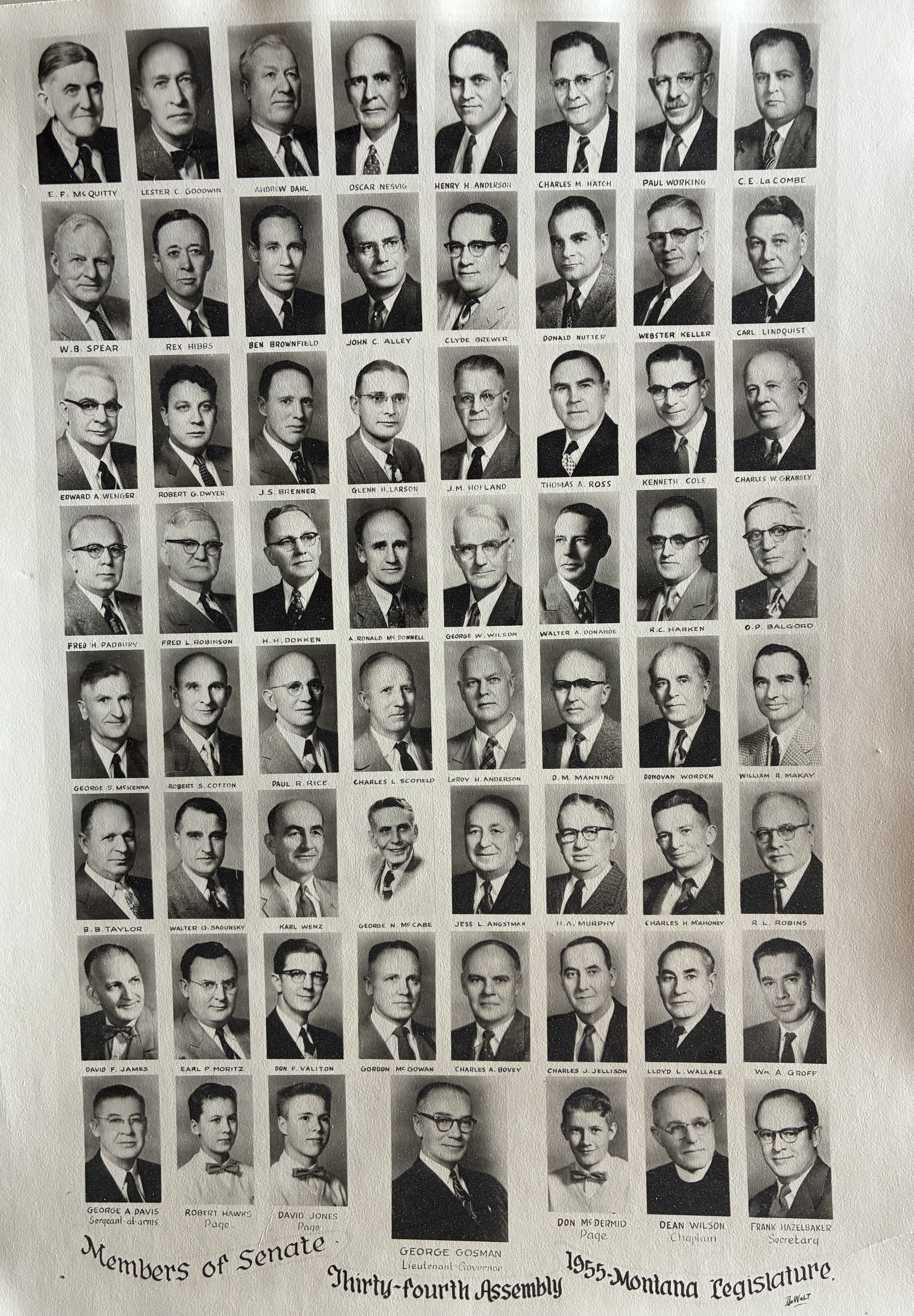
The 34th Montana Senate

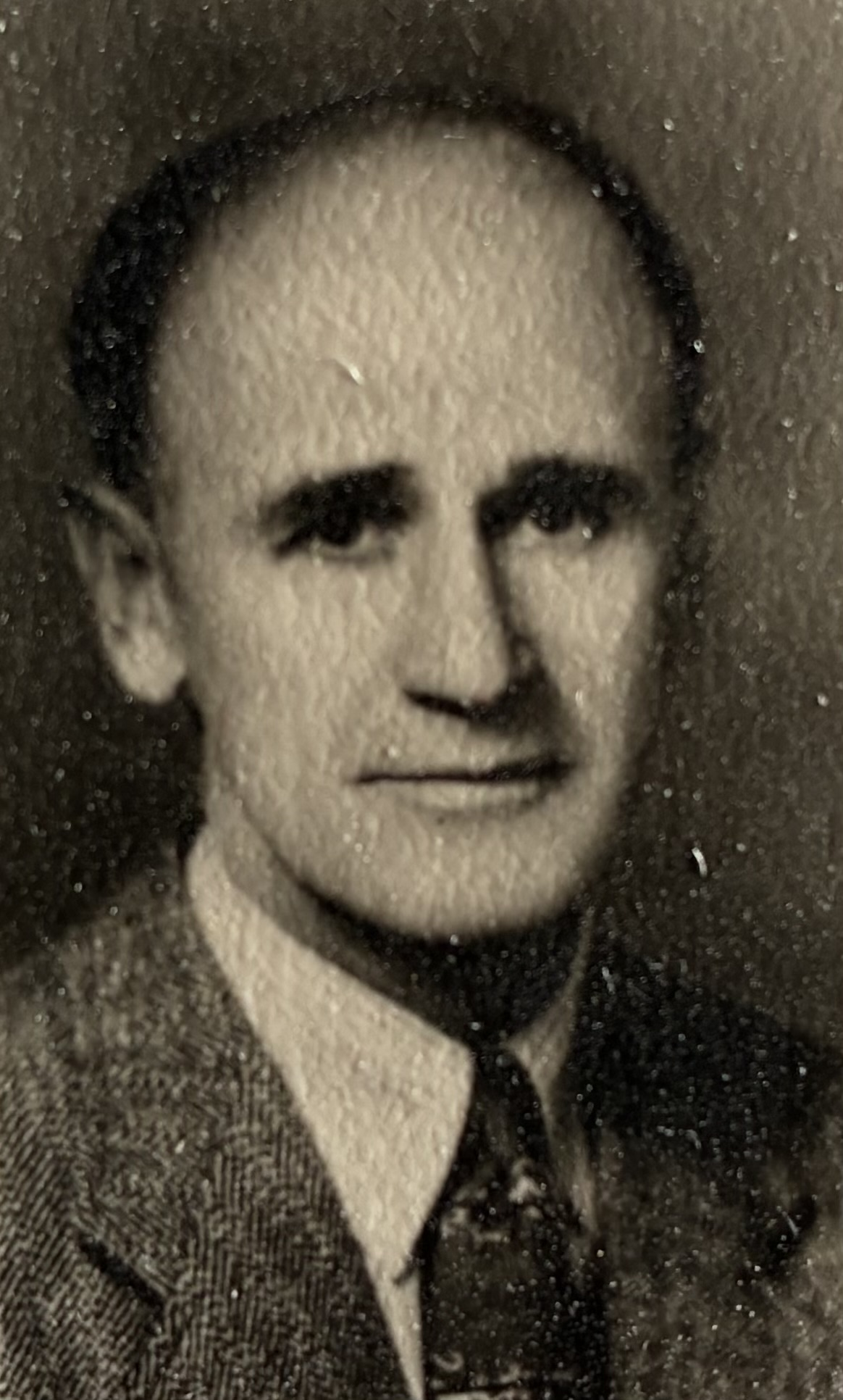
Portrait of McDonnell

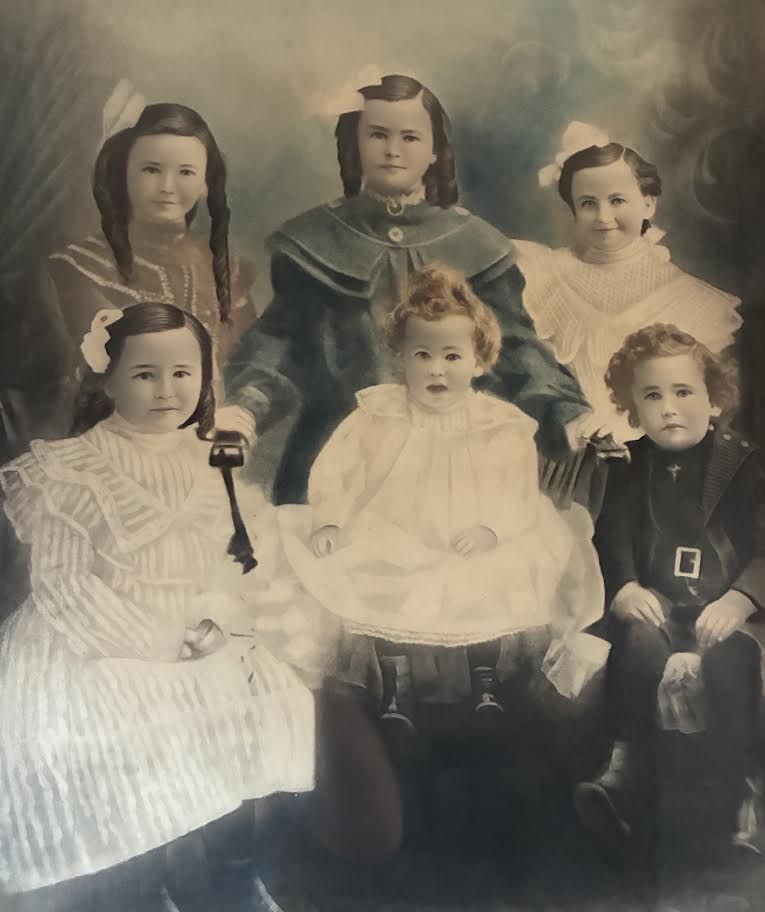
Top left to right: Edith, Ann, Mary Belle. Bottom left to right; Evelyn, Charlie, Ron

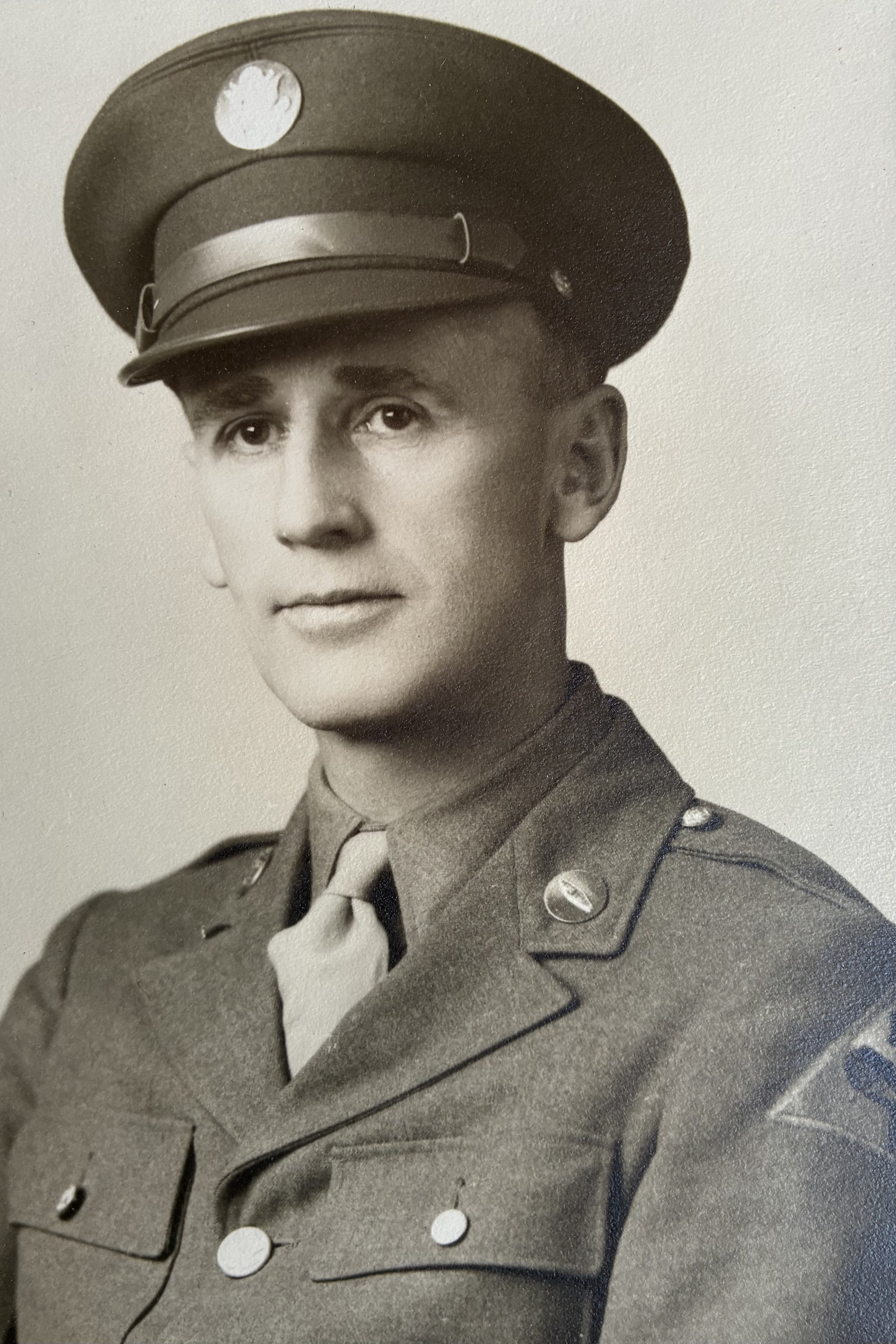
McDonnell's military portrait

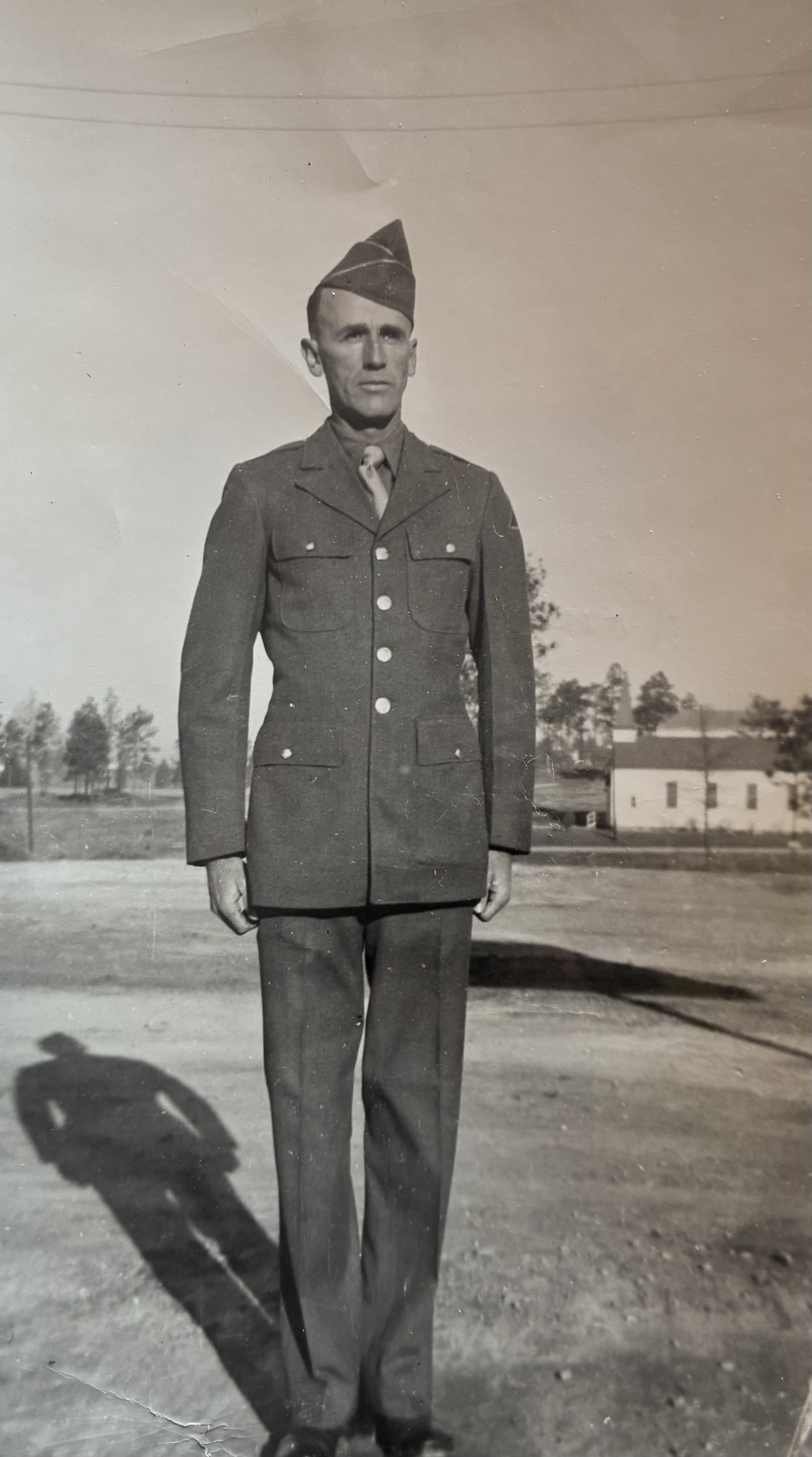
McDonnell in military dress

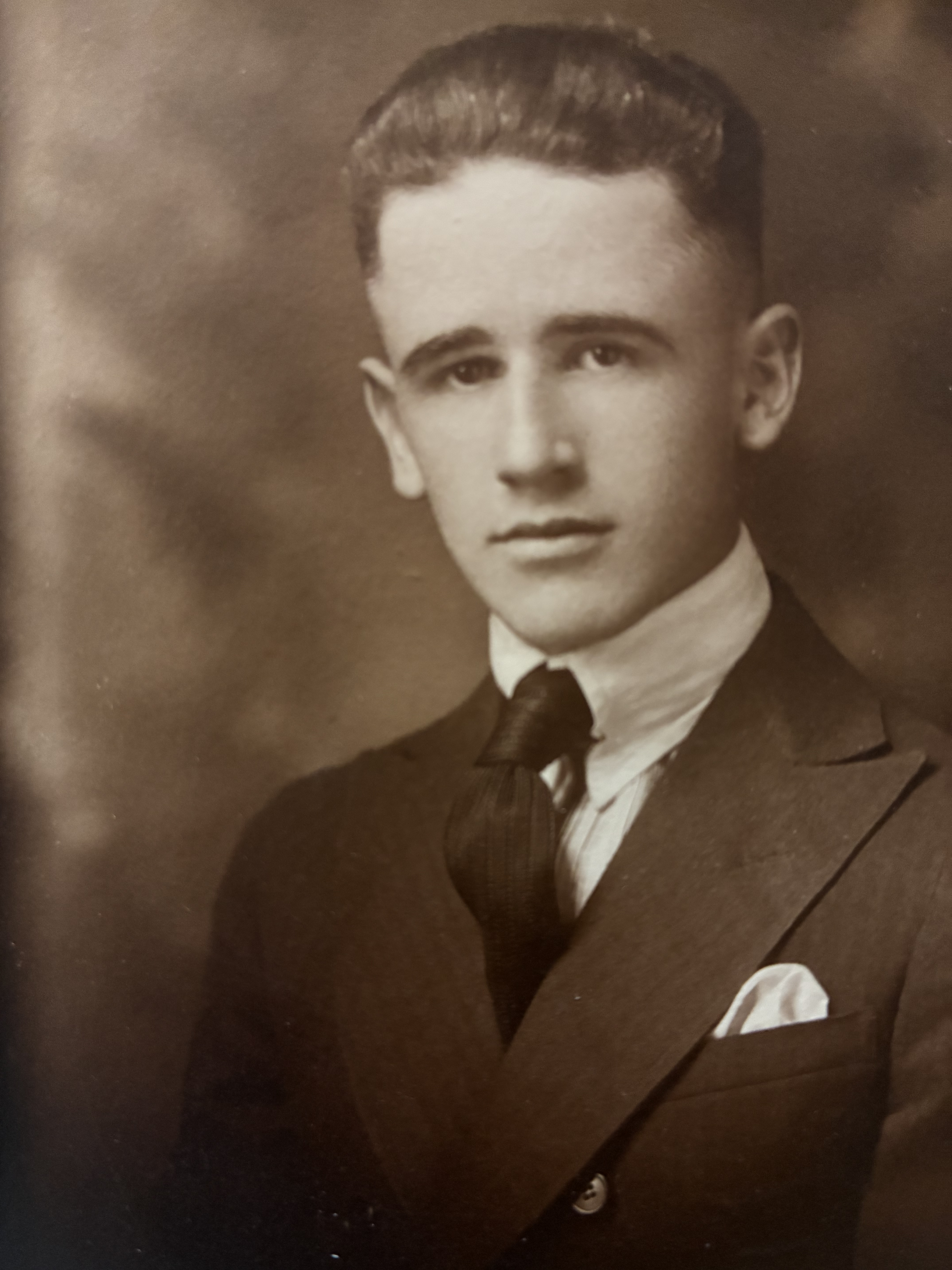
McDonnell's portrait during his time playing for the University of Montana Grizzlies

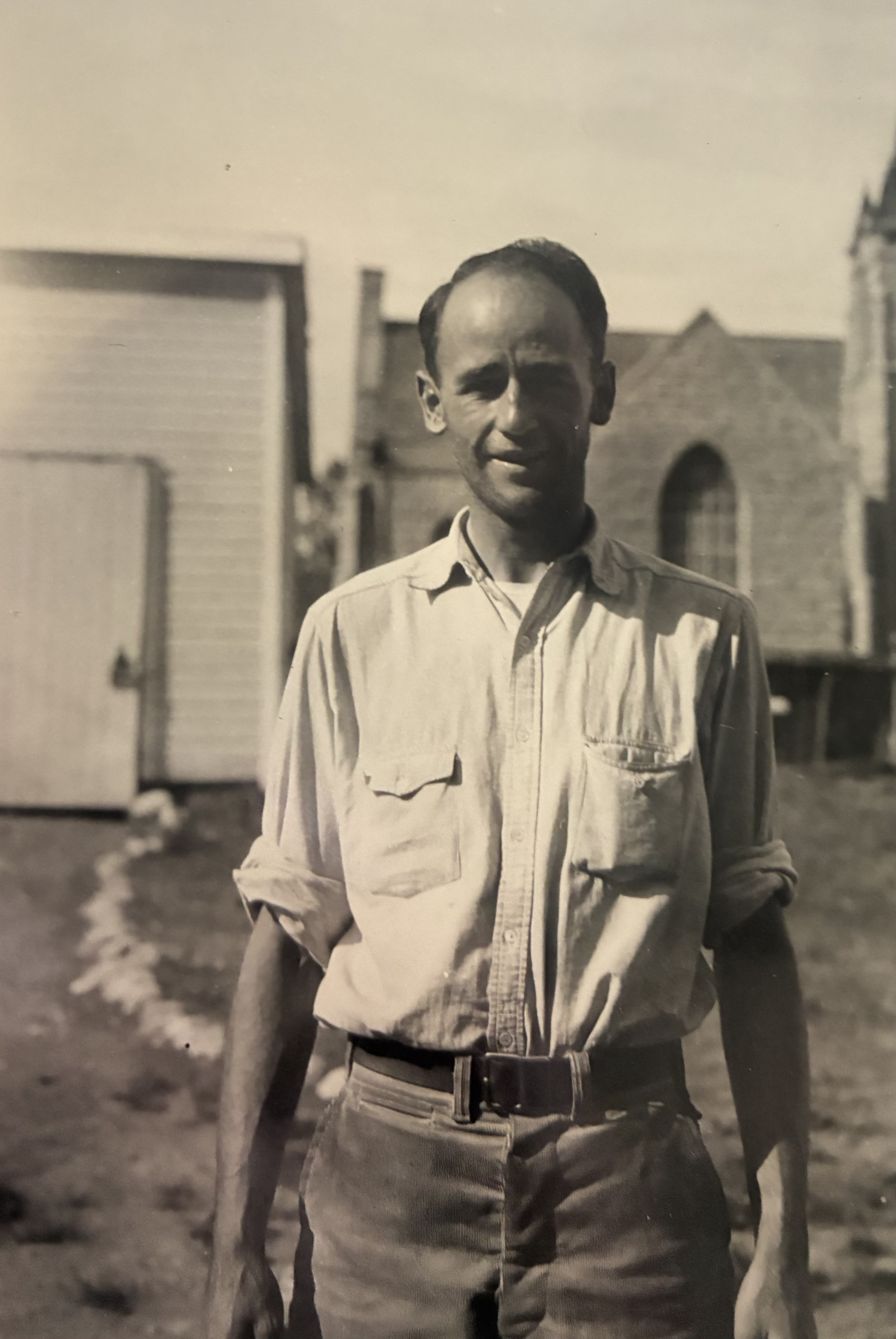
McDonnell standing behind his house

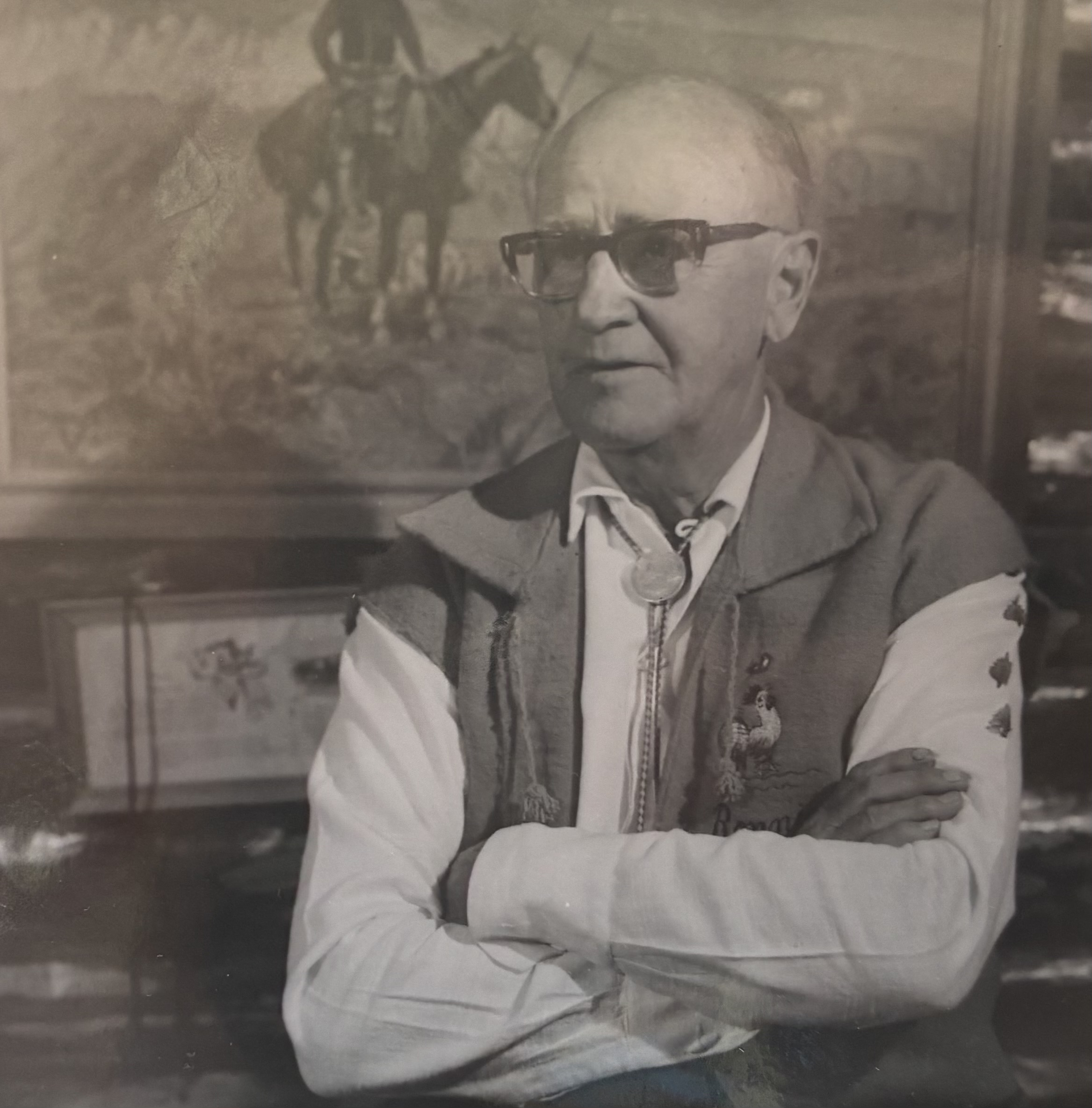
McDonnell in 1969

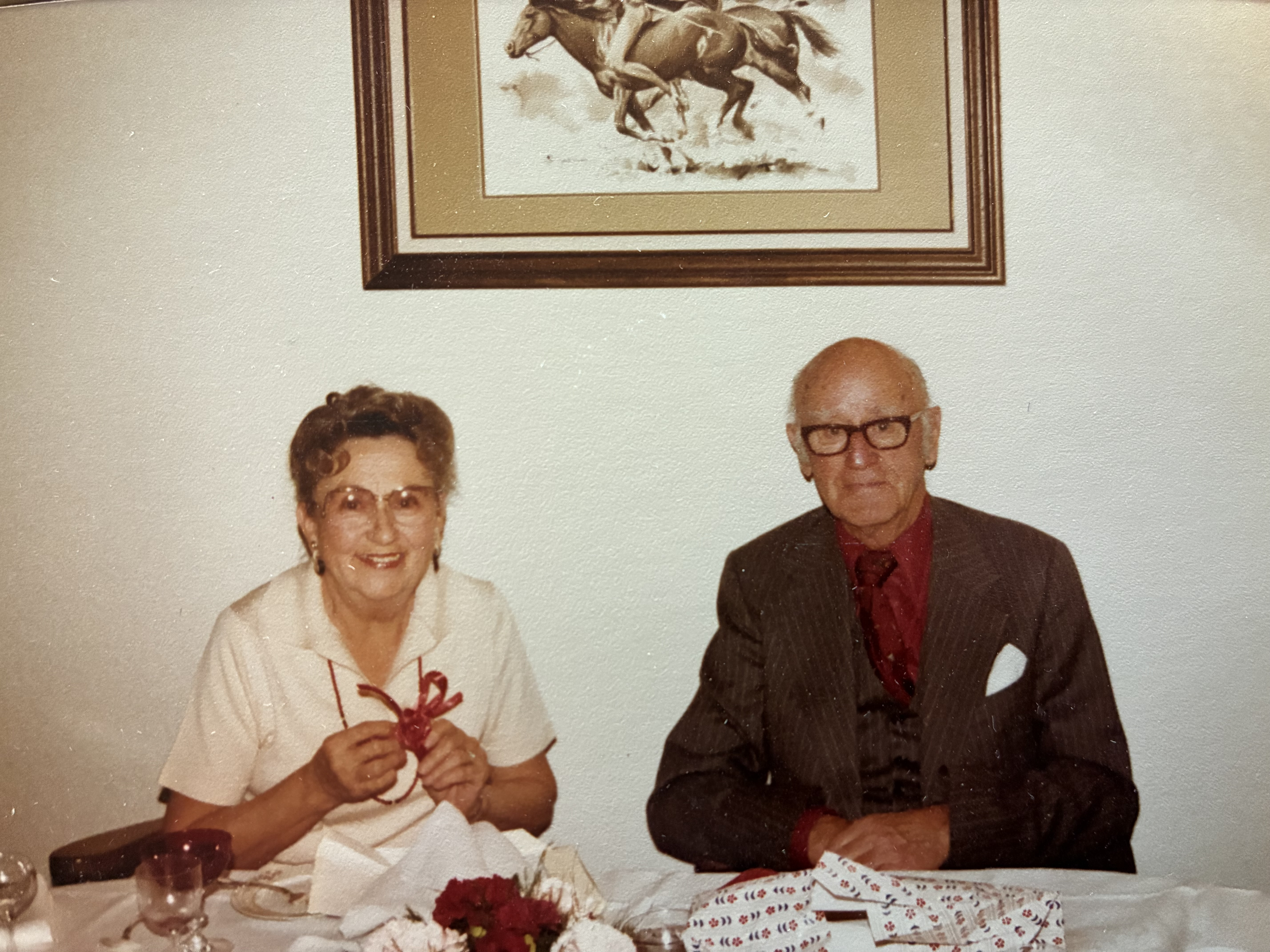
McDonnell and his wife Ellen in their house

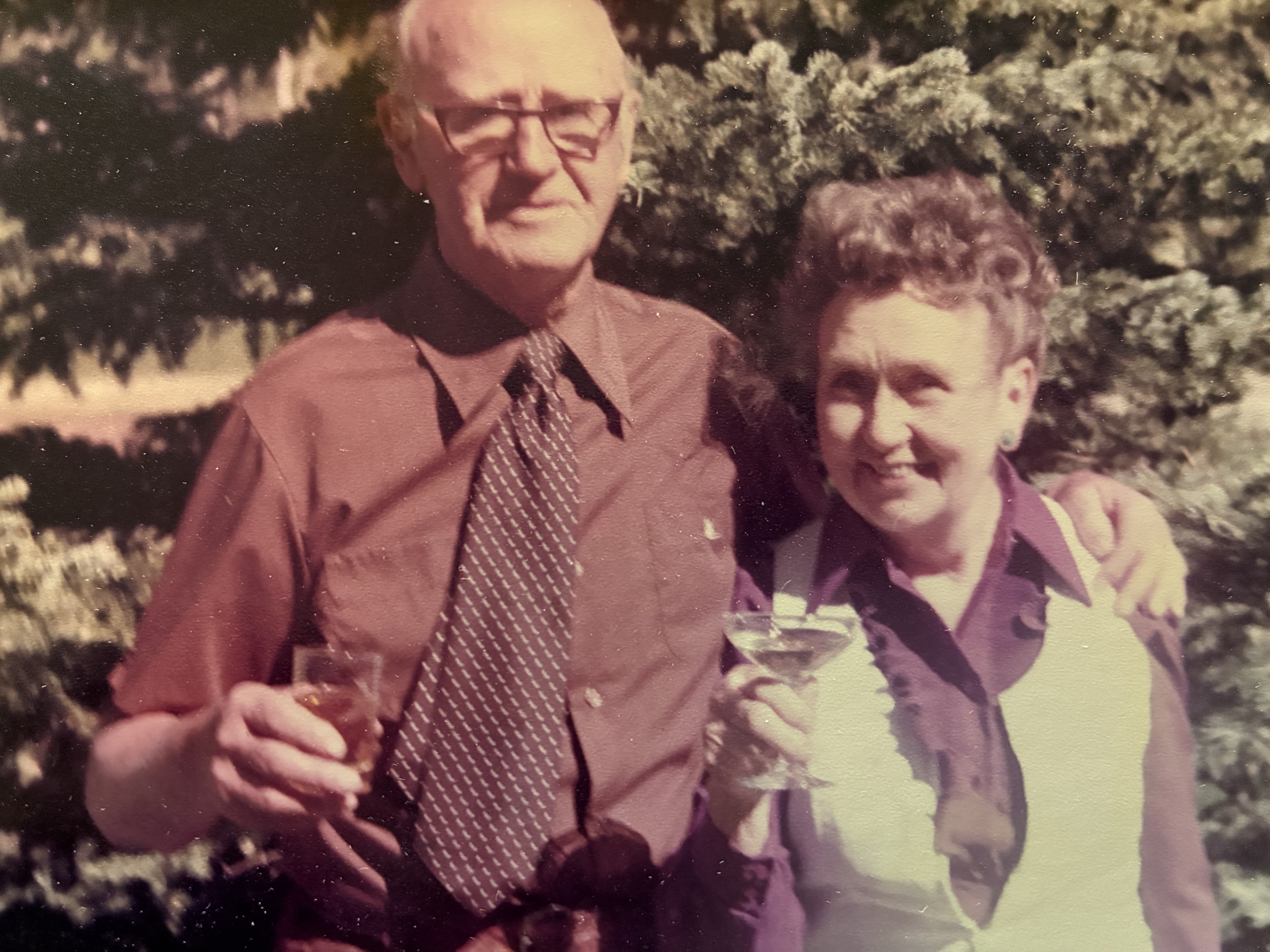
McDonnell and his wife Ellen at an event

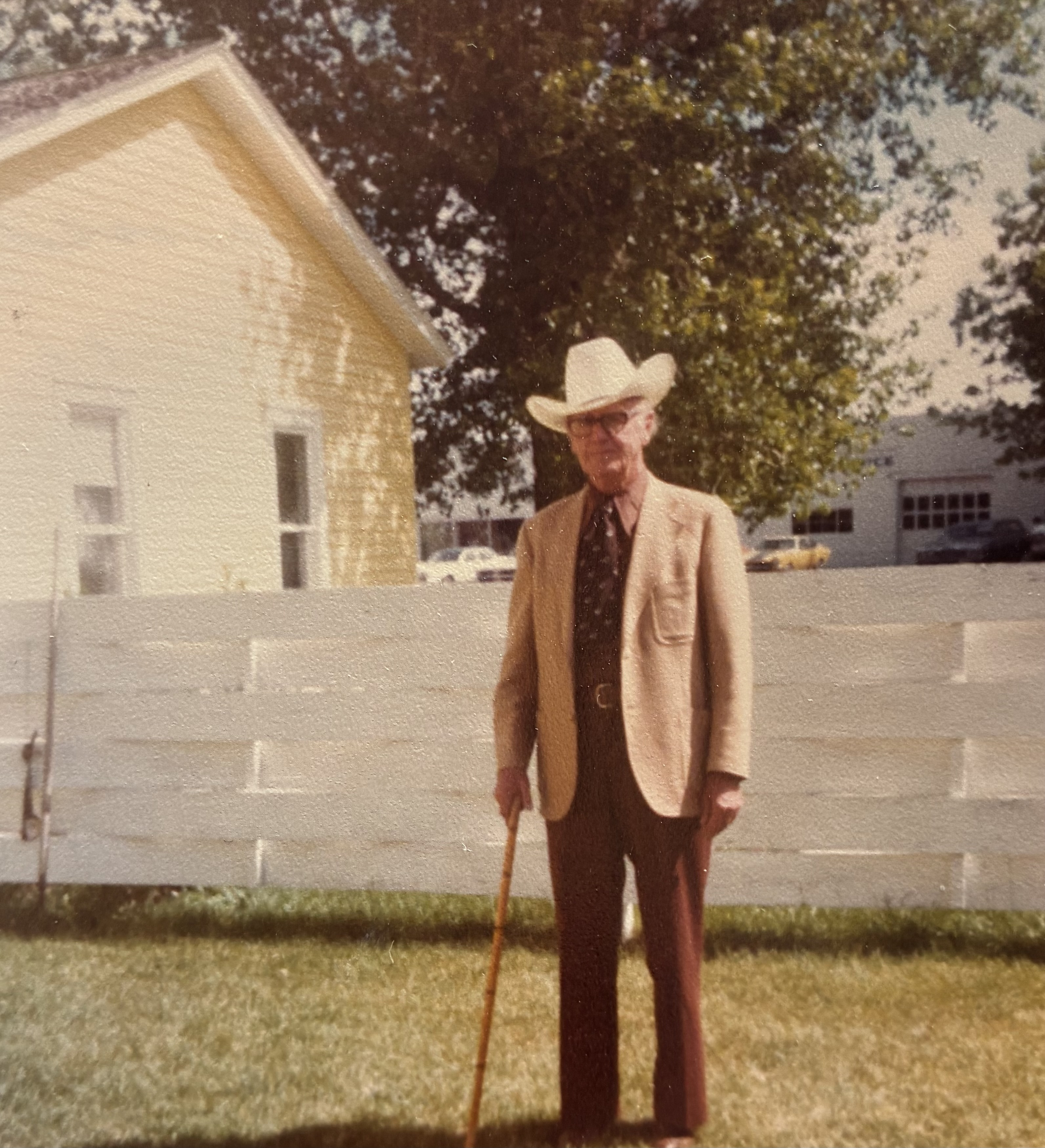
McDonnell in front of his house, 1989
