= Leo J. Cremer =

Montana politician

Leo Cremer

Member of the Montana Senate
- In office January 3, 1949 – January 5, 1953
- Succeeded by: A. Ronald McDonnell
Senate positions
Chair of the Courtesies and Good Fellowship Committee
In office
January 3, 1949 – January 1, 1951
Chair of the Fairs and Expositions Committee
In office
January 3, 1949 – January 1, 1951
Vice Chair of the Elections and Privileges Committee
In office
January 3, 1949 – January 1, 1951
Vice Chair of the Fairs and Expositions Committee
In office
January 1, 1951 – January 5, 1953

Personal details
- Born: October 30, 1891 Cashton, Wisconsin
- Died: November 28, 1953 (aged 62) Sweet Grass County, Montana
- Party: Independent
- Spouse: Bertha Stokes (1911–1953)
- Children: 1
- Education: Notre Dame University

Leo John Cremer (October 30, 1891 – November 28, 1953) or Mr. Rodeo was an American politician, cowboy, and businessman who served as a member of the Montana Senate and founded Leo J. Cremer World's Championship Rodeo Company. Cremer was later admitted into the Montana Cowboy Hall of Fame and the ProRodeo Hall of Fame.

== Youth ==
Cremer was born on October 30, 1891, in Cashton, Wisconsin, to John and Mary Cremer. Following his graduation from high school in Cashton Cremer enrolled at Notre Dame University to study law. While attending college one of Cremer's brothers homesteaded in Montana, and following his graduation Cremer moved West.

During his move to Montana Cremer met Bertha Stokes and the couple was married in 1911. The two set up a homestead outside of Melville and raised one son.

== Rodeo career ==
In 1919 Cremer witnessed his first rodeo. Following this he himself gave rodeoing a try and won two back-to-back titles in bulldogging, more formally known as steer wrestling. In 1926 residents of the nearby city of Big Timber found themselves needing horses for a rodeo. Cremer was known to have horses, which prompted the group to travel to his ranch to inquire about them. At the time they arrived at Cremer's ranch he was out haying his fields, so the group untied a few of the horses and rode them back to Big Timber. Some of horses bucked so much that they were used in the rodeo. This prompted Cremer to begin his own rodeo company.

=== Leo J. Cremer World's Champion Rodeo Company ===
For many years Cremer ran horses in the Big Timber, Butte, Livingston, and Billings rodeos.In 1934 Cremer expanded his reach by purchasing semi trucks. He began hauling horses to rodeos in Great Falls, Lewistown and Miles City. As time progressed Cremer continued to expand his company, later stocking bigger rodeos held in North Dakota, Utah, Idaho, Wyoming, Texas, Louisiana, Nebraska, and Minnesota. Throughout the 1930s and 1940s the company cleared profit. Cremer is attributed as establishing the greatest ring of bucking horses of all time.

Cremer was known as a very responsible businessman, notably supervising every detail of the transportation of his stock, directing the rodeo, and always maintaining the animals after every rodeo.

=== Entertainment and incidents ===
Cremer also provided entertainment during his rodeos, sporting special acts by Rex Allen, Gene Autry, and Sons of the Pioneers. Around 1940 famed bullfighting clown Slim Pickens worked for Cremer's company.

During a Big Timber rodeo a clown's car broke down in the center of the arena. Cremer wasted no time and tied a rope to the car and pulled it out of the arena by himself. He later stated "The show must go on!"

In 1936 Cremer began using buffalo as attractions in his rodeos, quickly making them his trademark attraction. However, in 1938 a buffalo hooked one of Cremer's "good" horses, killing it. This incident led to Cremer retiring the buffalo and switching to brahma bulls.

During one years Great Falls Fair, an airshow plane crashed into the horse barn and started a fire. The fire killed many of Cremer's horses. When the crash occurred a piece of the plane dislodged and hit rodeo clown Doug O'Donnell, knocking him from his horse. O'Donnell and his horse walked away from the incident unharmed.

== Montana Senate tenure ==
In 1948 Cremer was elected to the Montana Senate as an Independent by a razor thin margin, defeating his opponent by just one singular vote. He served throughout the 35th and 36th Montana Legislative Session. Cremer is the only independent Senator or Representative to have ever represented Sweet Grass County in the either Montana congressional chamber. In 1952 Cremer declined to seek re-election and was succeeded by Republican Alexander Ronald McDonnell

=== Committees ===
During the 35th session Cremer chaired the Courtesies and Good Fellowship Committee and the Fairs and Expositions Committee, vice chaired the Elections and Privileges Committee, and served on the Stock Growing and Grazing Committee and Water, Water Control and Flood Irrigation Committee.

During the 36th session Cremer vice chaired the Fairs and Expositions Committee while sitting on the Elections and Privileges Committee.

=== Big Timber capital joke ===
During a session during Cremer's tenure, an unexpectedly uneventful day found its way onto the Montana Senate floor. To break the silence Cremer jokingly introduced legislation that would move the state's capital from Helena to Big Timber. The joke quickly found its way into every newspaper in the state, garnering statewide attention and recognition. The move was seen by many as an overreach and Cremer even received a call from a Helena woman who said "You blankety-blank-blank - I hope you die!” The bill was tabled indefinitely and never reached a Senate vote.

== Death ==
Following Cremer's retirement from the Senate in January 1953, he returned to managing Leo J. Cremer World's Championship Rodeo Company. However his return would be short lived, as on November 28, 1953, Cremer was killed in a stock-truck accident. Following his death the rodeo company was sold to Gene Autry. Cremer was buried in Mountain View Cemetery in Big Timber.

Cremer was inducted into the ProRodeo Hall of Fame in Colorado Springs, Colorado, in 1979. Rodeos are still held annually in Big Timber and Cremer's legacy and artifacts are featured in the Crazy Mountain Museum outside of Big Timber.
