= Mulville =

Mulville is a surname. Notable people with the surname include:

- Daniel Mulville (born 1939), American engineer who served briefly as Acting Administrator of NASA in 2001
- Jacqui Mulville (active from 1995), British bioarchaeologist
- Jimmy Mulville (born 1955), English comedian, comedy writer, producer and television presenter

== See also ==
- Melville (disambiguation)
- Mulville House, a historic house in Norfolk, Connecticut
