= Melville Highlands =

The Melville Highlands (60°44′S 44°36′W) are an ice-covered upland rising to about 500 metres (1,600 ft) and forming the central part of Laurie Island between Pirie Peninsula and the south coast, in the South Orkney Islands off Antarctica. The name derives from James Weddell's map of 1825 whereon the name "Melville Island" appears for the already named Laurie Island; it was given for Robert Dundas, 2nd Viscount Melville, who was First Lord of the Admiralty, 1812–27 and 1828–30, including the period of Antarctic exploration by Weddell. To preserve the name in this area it was applied to these highlands by the UK Antarctic Place-Names Committee in 1987.
