= HMS Melville =

Three ships of the Royal Navy have borne the name HMS Melville:

- HMS Melville was an 18-gun brig-sloop, previously the French ship Naiade (Nayade). HMS Jason captured her in 1805; Melville was sold in 1808.
- HMS Melville (1813), also known as HMS Lord Melville, was a 14-gun brig launched in 1813, renamed HMS Star in 1814 and sold in 1837.
- HMS Melville (1817) was a 74-gun third rate launched in 1817, used as a hospital ship from 1857, and sold in 1873.

== See also ==
- HMCS Melville
- HMAS Melville
