= HMAS Melville =

One ship and one naval base of the Royal Australian Navy have been named HMAS Melville, after Melville Island.

- HMAS Melville (naval base), a naval base in Darwin, which operated from 1940 until its destruction by Cyclone Tracy in 1974
- HMAS Melville (A 246), a Leeuwin-class hydrographic survey vessel commissioned in 2000 and active as of 2016

== See also ==
- HMS Melville, three ships of the Royal Navy
