= Melville Bridge Club =

Contract bridge club

The New Melville Bridge Club is a contract bridge club situated a little outside the centre of Edinburgh. It was established in 1936 as the Melville Bridge Club and changed its name when it moved to its present premises in 2013. With about 300 members, it is one of the two largest bridge clubs in Edinburgh (the other being the Carlton Bridge Club), and is one of the largest in Scotland.

The club has members ranging in ability from beginner to grand master. It is home to a significant number of Scotland's current and past internationalists. In the first World Mindsport Games in 2008 in Beijing all bar one of the open team and the majority of the ladies team came from the club.

The club hosts pairs and teams duplicate events and also rubber bridge. The club is also extensively used for matches and events organised by the Eastern District of the Scottish Bridge Union - the governing body for the game in Scotland. Various national events are also staged in the club.

Visitors can also play at the club, and details are available on the website.

The club first rented property at 44 Melville Street in the Edinburgh New Town, one of the grander streets in Edinburgh named after Viscount Melville. In 1950 the club moved to a four storey Victorian Town House at 9 Grosvenor Crescent. 9 Grosvenor Crescent was built in 1868 firstly as a private house later becoming a maternity home during the Second World War and then part of the Edinburgh College of Domestic Science.

During the excavations for the new building, a number of Bronze Age swords were found, some of which are now part of the collection in the National Museum of Scotland.

In the summer of 2013, the club again moved premises to its current location at 1 Pinkhill in Corstorphine. At the same time, the club attained the status of a charitable organization and began trading under the name New Melville Bridge Club Ltd.

A bridge club of the same name exists in the City of Melville in Australia.
