= USS Melville =

Two ships of the United States Navy have borne the name Melville, in honor of George W. Melville, an engineer and arctic explorer.

- USS Melville (AD-2), was a destroyer tender, launched in 1913 and struck in 1947
- USNS Melville (T-AGOR-14), is a Robert D. Conrad-class oceanographic research ship, launched in 1968 and chartered to the Scripps Institution of Oceanography for operation as RV Melville. She is currently in active service at the Philippines hydrographic office.
