= Big Timber, Montana =

City in Montana, United States

Big Timber
- City
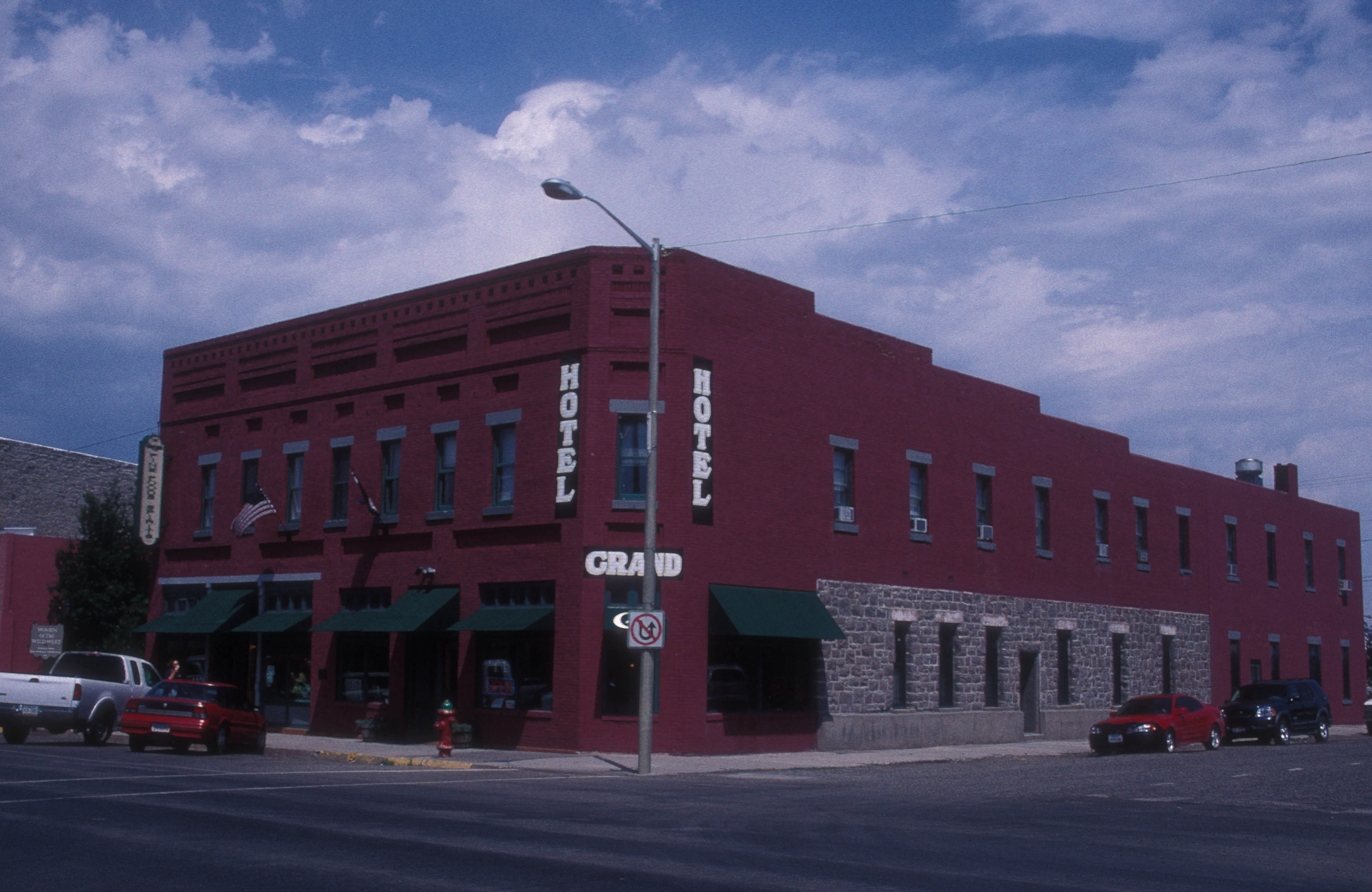
- The Grand Hotel

- Location of Big Timber, Montana
- Coordinates: 45°50′05″N 109°56′54″W
- Country: United States
- State: Montana
- County: Sweet Grass

Government
  - Type: Mayor Council
  - Mayor: Justin Ferguson
  - City Council: Leonard Woehler; Jeff Davis; Kerri Baird; Mike Duval

Area
  - Total: 0.98 sq mi (2.53 km^{2})
  - Land: 0.98 sq mi (2.53 km^{2})
  - Water: 0 sq mi (0.00 km^{2})
- Elevation: 4,095 ft (1,248 m)

Population (2020)
  - Total: 1,650
  - Density: 1,688.3/sq mi (651.84/km^{2})
- Time zone: UTC−7 (Mountain (MST))
  - Summer (DST): UTC−6 (MDT)
- ZIP code: 59011
- Area code: 406
- FIPS code: 30-06475
- GNIS feature ID: 2409846
- Website: www.cityofbigtimber.com

Big Timber is a city in and the county seat of Sweet Grass County, Montana, United States. The population was 1,650 at the 2020 census.

Big Timber takes its name from Big Timber Creek, which was named by William Clark because of the large cottonwood trees. The post office was established in 1880, closed, then reopened in 1882 with Ella Burns as postmaster. In 1881 Charles McDonnell became the first person to drive sheep into Sweet Grass County and Big Timber. As a stop on the Northern Pacific Railroad, Big Timber became a major wool-shipping depot. It became the county seat in 1895. In 1902, rancher John F. Asbury was elected the first mayor of Big Timber. A fire in 1908 destroyed half the commercial buildings and a third of the residential homes.

== Geography ==
According to the United States Census Bureau, the city has a total area of 0.95 square miles (2.46 km^{2}), of which 0.92 square miles (2.38 km^{2}) is land and 0.03 square miles (0.08 km^{2}) is water.

=== Climate ===
Big Timber has a cool semi-arid climate (Köppen BSk) bordering on a humid continental climate (Dfb). Although winters can be frigid, frequent chinook winds will raise temperatures above 50 °F or 10 °C on an average twenty days between December and February, and have raised them to or above 68 °F or 20 °C on ten occasions during these months since 1894. The chinooks mean Big Timber's 31.3 days per year failing to top freezing is among the fewest in Montana, with the average window for such maxima being from November 11 to March 18. In the absence of chinooks, temperatures fall to 0 °F or −17.8 °C on seventeen mornings during an average winter, although such temperatures were reached just once in 1999/2000 but as many as thirty-four times during the very cold winters of 1935/1936 and 1978/1979. The average window for zero temperatures is from December 4 to February 25. The coldest temperature in Big Timber has been −47 °F (−43.9 °C) during the notorious 1936 cold wave on February 15, while February 1936 was also the coldest month on record at 5.0 °F or −15.0 °C, shading January 1916 which averaged 5.5 °F or −14.7 °C.

Spring is typically windy with temperatures nearly as variable as in winter: the last frost typically arrives on May 19, but temperatures have reached 80 °F or 26.7 °C as early as March 22, 1928, and have fallen to 0 °F or −17.8 °C as late as April 13, 1928, and April 12, 1997. Late in spring thunderstorms increase in frequency and during late spring and early summer these provide most of Big Timber's annual precipitation. The wettest calendar year since 1894 has been 1957 with 25.71 inches (653.0 mm) and the driest 1939 with 9.38 inches (238.3 mm), while the wettest single month has been May 1981 with 7.69 inches (195.3 mm)

During the summer, days can be very hot, with maxima of 90 °F or 32.2 °C on 28.5 afternoons and over 100 °F or 37.8 °C on 1.1, although mornings very rarely stay above 65 °F or 18.3 °C. The record hottest temperature is 110 °F (43.3 °C) on July 21, 1931, and the hottest morning 73 °F (22.8 °C) on July 31, 1936.

The fall season is usually short and variable, with snow occasionally falling in September, but at other times hot weather can extend into October or even November.

Climate data for Big Timber, Montana, 1991–2020 normals, extremes 1894–present
Month	Jan	Feb	Mar	Apr	May	Jun	Jul	Aug	Sep	Oct	Nov	Dec	Year
Record high °F (°C)	78 (26)	72 (22)	80 (27)	89 (32)	97 (36)	106 (41)	110 (43)	107 (42)	100 (38)	88 (31)	78 (26)	80 (27)	110 (43)
Mean maximum °F (°C)	56.1 (13.4)	58.7 (14.8)	68.0 (20.0)	77.0 (25.0)	84.0 (28.9)	92.0 (33.3)	97.5 (36.4)	96.3 (35.7)	91.3 (32.9)	80.0 (26.7)	65.6 (18.7)	56.4 (13.6)	98.3 (36.8)
Mean daily maximum °F (°C)	38.1 (3.4)	40.0 (4.4)	49.3 (9.6)	56.8 (13.8)	66.6 (19.2)	75.8 (24.3)	86.2 (30.1)	84.9 (29.4)	74.1 (23.4)	59.0 (15.0)	45.9 (7.7)	37.2 (2.9)	59.5 (15.3)
Daily mean °F (°C)	28.8 (−1.8)	29.8 (−1.2)	37.7 (3.2)	44.6 (7.0)	53.4 (11.9)	61.9 (16.6)	69.8 (21.0)	68.1 (20.1)	58.8 (14.9)	46.7 (8.2)	35.9 (2.2)	28.4 (−2.0)	47.0 (8.3)
Mean daily minimum °F (°C)	19.5 (−6.9)	19.6 (−6.9)	26.0 (−3.3)	32.4 (0.2)	40.3 (4.6)	47.9 (8.8)	53.5 (11.9)	51.3 (10.7)	43.4 (6.3)	34.4 (1.3)	26.0 (−3.3)	19.5 (−6.9)	34.5 (1.4)
Mean minimum °F (°C)	−10.8 (−23.8)	−6.3 (−21.3)	2.3 (−16.5)	17.2 (−8.2)	26.6 (−3.0)	36.8 (2.7)	44.3 (6.8)	40.2 (4.6)	30.1 (−1.1)	14.3 (−9.8)	0.3 (−17.6)	−7.4 (−21.9)	−20.5 (−29.2)
Record low °F (°C)	−36 (−38)	−47 (−44)	−32 (−36)	−10 (−23)	10 (−12)	26 (−3)	33 (1)	28 (−2)	12 (−11)	−14 (−26)	−29 (−34)	−38 (−39)	−47 (−44)
Average precipitation inches (mm)	0.73 (19)	0.65 (17)	0.98 (25)	2.18 (55)	3.06 (78)	2.63 (67)	1.38 (35)	0.99 (25)	1.31 (33)	1.51 (38)	0.78 (20)	0.73 (19)	16.93 (431)
Average snowfall inches (cm)	7.1 (18)	10.8 (27)	9.1 (23)	3.6 (9.1)	0.6 (1.5)	0.0 (0.0)	0.0 (0.0)	0.0 (0.0)	0.5 (1.3)	4.8 (12)	7.9 (20)	10.2 (26)	54.6 (137.9)
Average precipitation days (≥ 0.01 in)	4.7	4.4	6.1	8.6	11.4	10.6	7.5	5.4	6.3	7.2	4.9	4.4	81.5
Average snowy days (≥ 0.1 in)	2.6	3.1	2.1	1.3	0.1	0.0	0.0	0.0	0.2	1.2	2.2	2.4	15.2
Source 1: NOAA
Source 2: National Weather Service

== Demographics ==
Historical population
Census	Pop.	Note	%±
1880	100		—
1890	265		165.0%
1900	850		220.8%
1910	1,022		20.2%
1920	1,282		25.4%
1930	1,224		−4.5%
1940	1,533		25.2%
1950	1,679		9.5%
1960	1,660		−1.1%
1970	1,592		−4.1%
1980	1,690		6.2%
1990	1,557		−7.9%
2000	1,650		6.0%
2010	1,641		−0.5%
2020	1,650		0.5%
source: U.S. Decennial Census

=== 2020 census ===
As of the 2020 census, Big Timber had a population of 1,650. The median age was 44.4 years. 22.1% of residents were under the age of 18 and 26.1% of residents were 65 years of age or older. For every 100 females there were 102.0 males, and for every 100 females age 18 and over there were 97.7 males age 18 and over.

0.0% of residents lived in urban areas, while 100.0% lived in rural areas.

There were 763 households in Big Timber, of which 25.8% had children under the age of 18 living in them. Of all households, 40.4% were married-couple households, 25.8% were households with a male householder and no spouse or partner present, and 28.6% were households with a female householder and no spouse or partner present. About 40.2% of all households were made up of individuals and 19.3% had someone living alone who was 65 years of age or older.

There were 885 housing units, of which 13.8% were vacant. The homeowner vacancy rate was 1.8% and the rental vacancy rate was 7.0%.

Racial composition as of the 2020 census
Race	Number	Percent
White	1,507	91.3%
Black or African American	7	0.4%
American Indian and Alaska Native	19	1.2%
Asian	5	0.3%
Native Hawaiian and Other Pacific Islander	2	0.1%
Some other race	9	0.5%
Two or more races	101	6.1%
Hispanic or Latino (of any race)	63	3.8%

=== 2010 census ===
As of the census of 2010, there were 1,641 people, 751 households, and 429 families residing in the city. The population density was 1,783.7 inhabitants per square mile (688.7/km^{2}). There were 933 housing units at an average density of 1,014.1 per square mile (391.5/km^{2}). The racial makeup of the city was 95.9% White, 0.1% African American, 0.5% Native American, 0.7% Asian, 0.1% Pacific Islander, 0.5% from other races, and 2.3% from two or more races. Hispanic or Latino of any race were 1.8% of the population.

There were 751 households, of which 28.0% had children under the age of 18 living with them, 43.5% were married couples living together, 9.5% had a female householder with no husband present, 4.1% had a male householder with no wife present, and 42.9% were non-families. 38.7% of all households were made up of individuals, and 20.9% had someone living alone who was 65 years of age or older. The average household size was 2.13 and the average family size was 2.82.

The median age in the city was 45.5 years. 23.1% of residents were under the age of 18; 5.8% were between the ages of 18 and 24; 20.8% were from 25 to 44; 25.2% were from 45 to 64; and 25.2% were 65 years of age or older. The gender makeup of the city was 48.5% male and 51.5% female.

=== 2000 census ===
As of the census of 2000, there were 1,650 people, 711 households, and 430 families residing in the city. The population density was 1,752.6 inhabitants per square mile (676.7/km^{2}). There were 812 housing units at an average density of 862.5 per square mile (333.0/km^{2}). The racial makeup of the city was 96.61% White, 0.79% Native American, 0.30% Asian, 0.06% Pacific Islander, 0.73% from other races, and 1.52% from two or more races. Hispanic or Latino of any race were 1.70% of the population.

There were 711 households, out of which 27.8% had children under the age of 18 living with them, 52.2% were married couples living together, 5.5% had a female householder with no husband present, and 39.5% were non-families. 34.7% of all households were made up of individuals, and 19.4% had someone living alone who was 65 years of age or older. The average household size was 2.24 and the average family size was 2.92.

In the city, the population was spread out, with 23.7% under the age of 18, 6.6% from 18 to 24, 23.2% from 25 to 44, 23.7% from 45 to 64, and 22.8% who were 65 years of age or older. The median age was 42 years. For every 100 females there were 96.4 males. For every 100 females age 18 and over, there were 91.9 males.

The median income for a household in the city was $30,595, and the median income for a family was $38,869. Males had a median income of $29,000 versus $17,596 for females. The per capita income for the city was $17,569. About 9.3% of families and 10.8% of the population were below the poverty line, including 15.9% of those under age 18 and 7.6% of those age 65 or over.

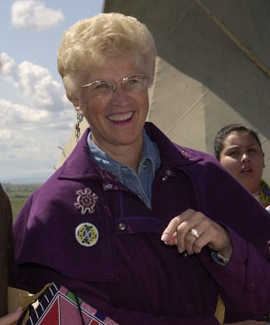
Judy Martz

== Notable people ==
- Orvin B. Fjare, United States Congressman from Montana
- Bobby Hauck, head football coach of the University of Montana football team
- Michael Keaton, Academy Award-nominated actor
- Leo J. Cremer, former Montana State Senator and Pro Rodeo Hall of Famer
- Judy Martz, 22nd Governor of Montana( 2001-2005)
- Charles McDonnell, former Montana state Senator and pioneer

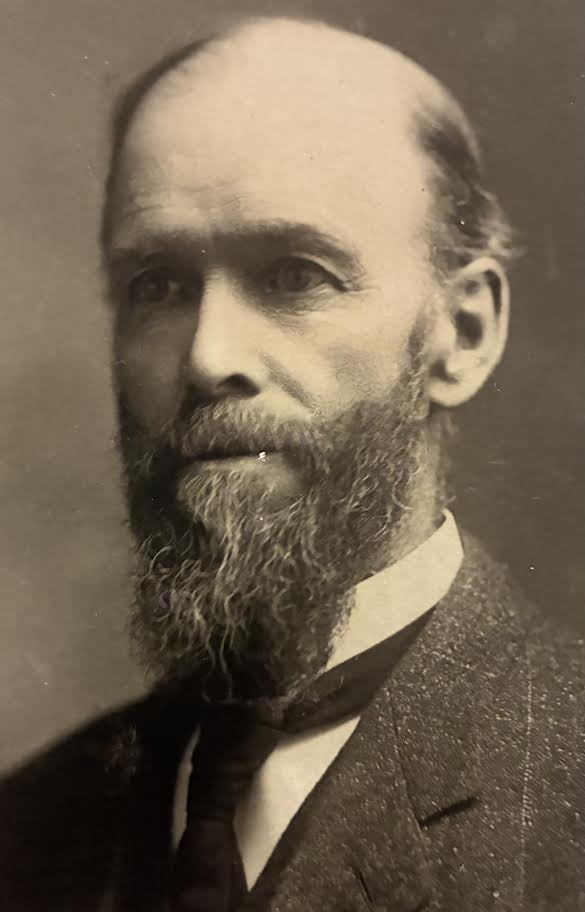
Charles McDonnell

== Government ==
Big Timber has a mayor and city council. All positions are non-partisan and have four-year terms. There are two wards, each with two council members.

The current mayor of Big Timber is Justin Ferguson, who assumed office in 2026, and the four city council members are Leonard Woehler, Jeff Davis, Kerri Baird, and Mike Duval.

=== Mayoral Election Results(2021-) ===
In the 2021 mayoral election Greg DeBoer was elected mayor with 77.69% of the vote over Lee Andreas(12.14%) and Lucas Lee(10.16%). DeBoer is a chiropractor and owner of Crazy Peak Chiropractic. This election saw a relatively large voter turnout with 707 people turning out.

In the mayoral election in November 2025 Justin Ferguson was elected with 61.98% of the vote against Lee Andreas(38.10%). Ferguson was a council member for 16 years. This election saw a 19.58% decline from the 2021 election with a voter turnout of 50.39%. Ferguson succeeded Greg DeBoer on January 1, 2026.

== List of mayors ==
Since 1902, mayors have served four year terms. There have been 29 mayors of Big Timber. A dagger (†) indicates mayoralties cut short by death in office. The longest serving mayor of Big Timber is Harold Boe, who served in the office for 18 years. Meanwhile the shortest serving mayor was Douglas D. Lowry who was appointed to the office and served for only 4 months and 27 days.

No.	Name (birth–death)	Term	Previous office
1	John F. Asbury	1902-1911	
2	DH Marsh	1912-April 1913	
3	J R Kaiserman	April 1913-1914	Superintendent of the City Water and Electric Light Utilities
4	Ernest R Patterson (c. 1886-1943)	1914-1915	
5	J A Elliot	1915-July 1916; Resigned	
6	Drura Claiborn (c. 1875–1959)	July 1916-July 1918; Resigned	Member of the Big Timber City Council
7	John A. Lowry (c. 1869–1939)	September 1918-May 1921	Member of the Big Timber City Council
8	John A. Trower (c. 1886-1933)	May 1921-April 1927	
9	Albert P O'Leary; 1st term (c. 1870-1935)	May 1927-1931	
10	Gilbert H. "Major" Goosey (c. 1872-1937)	1931-1935	
11	Albert P O'Leary; 2nd term (c. 1870-1935)	1935-December 28, 1935(†)	9th Mayor of Big Timber
12	O Nordstrom	January 1936-May 1945	
13	Harold Boe (c. 1894-1978)	1945-1963	
14	H Klindt	1963-1969	
15	Arthur L Schump (c. 1897-1997)	1969-1973	
16	McLean "Mac" Clark (c. 1914-1982)	1973-1977	
17	Oscar Stephens (c. 1905-1978)	1977-April 30, 1978(†)	Member of the Big Timber City Council
18	Harold McLaughlan	May 1978-1982	Member of the Big Timber City Council
19	John O. Drivdahl	1982-1990	
	Vacant	1990-1993	
20	James A. Devenny; 1st term (c. 1944-2020)	1993-1998	
21	Gary Smart	1998-April 30, 2001; Resigned	
22	Tom Hanel (c. 1954/55-Present)	May 1, 2001-June 24, 2003; Resigned	Member of the Big Timber City Council
23	Douglas D. Lowry	August 4, 2003-December 31, 2003; Appointed to Fill Until End of Year	Member of the Big Timber City Council
24	James A. Devenny; 2nd term (c. 1944-2020)	January 1, 2004-December 31, 2005	20th Mayor of Big Timber
25	Diana Taylor	January 1, 2006-December 31, 2009	
26	Mark Stephens	January 1, 2010-December 31, 2017	
27	Rolland Karlin	January 1, 2018-December 31, 2021	
28	Greg DeBoer (c. 1961/62-Present)	January 1, 2022-December 31, 2025	
29	Justin Ferguson (c. 1973-Present)	January 1, 2026-Present	Member of the Big Timber City Council

== Arts and culture ==
The Crazy Mountain Museum has a focus on the area history. In addition to the indoor displays there are outdoor replicas, including a homestead cabin from Swedish settlers to the area, and a large garden based on plant descriptions from the Lewis and Clark Expedition.

Carnegie Public Library serves the Big Timber area.

== Infrastructure ==
Insterstate 90 passes to the south of Big Timber while U.S. Route 191 runs directly through town.

Big Timber Airport is a public use airport located 3 miles southwest of town.

Intercity bus service to the city is provided by Jefferson Lines.

== Education ==
Sweet Grass County High School provides public high school education in Big Timber. They are known as the Sheepherders.

== Media ==
The local newspaper is the Big Timber Pioneer. It is published weekly.

A satellite of Yellowstone Public Radio, KYPB, is licensed in Big Timber.

== See also ==
- List of cities and towns in Montana
