= Melville, Montana =

Melville
- Unincorporated community
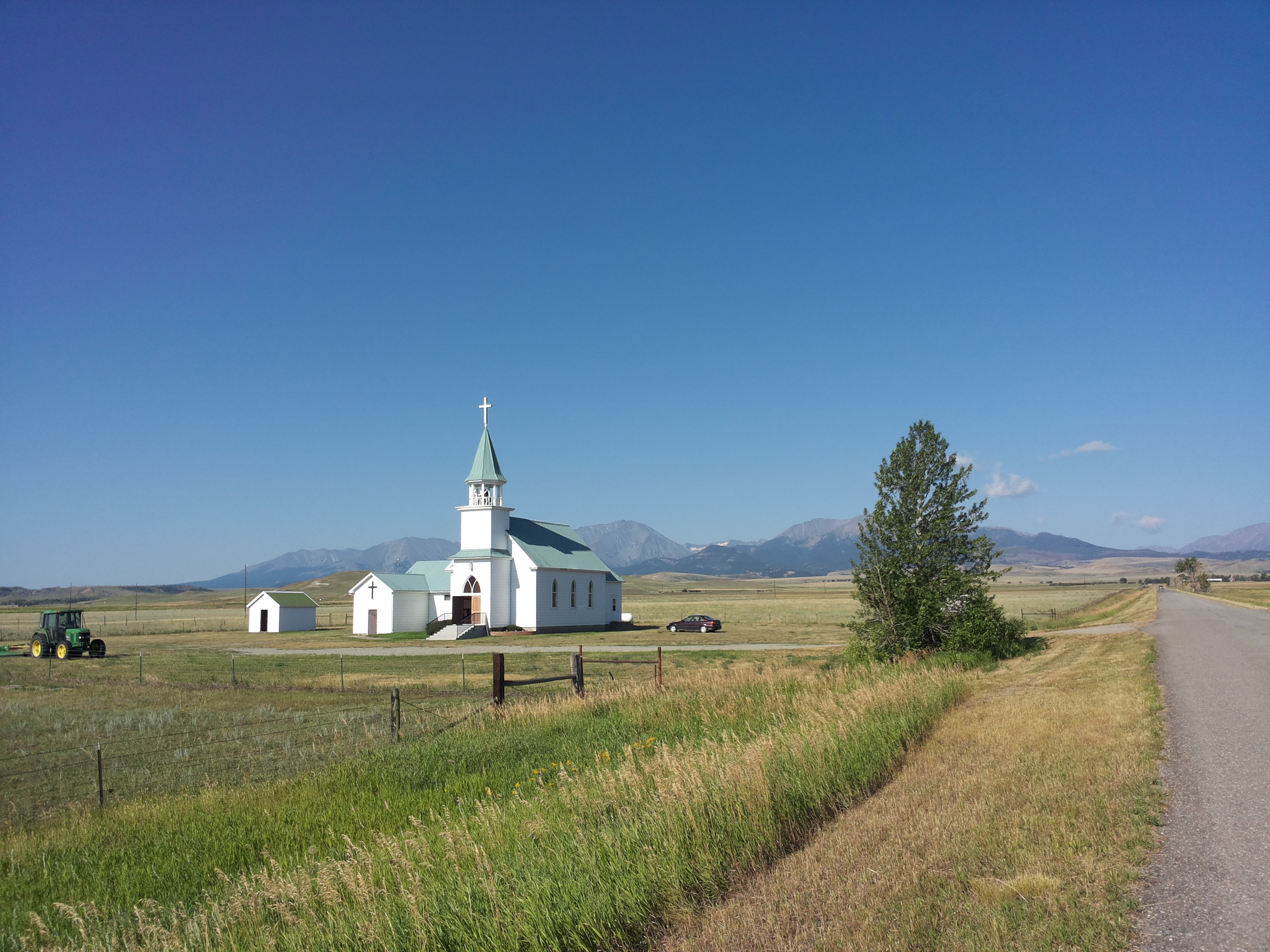
- Melville Lutheran Church

- Location within the state of Montana
- Coordinates: 46°6′11″N 109°57′14″W
- Country: United States
- State: Montana
- County: Sweet Grass
- Elevation: 5,017 ft (1,529 m)
- Time zone: UTC-7 (Mountain (MST))
  - Summer (DST): UTC-6 (MDT)
- ZIP codes: 59055
- GNIS feature ID: 774098

Melville is an unincorporated community in northern Sweet Grass County, Montana, United States. It lies along local roads just west of U.S. Route 191, north of the city of Big Timber, the county seat of Sweet Grass County. Its elevation is 5,020 feet (1,530 m). Although Melville is unincorporated, it has a post office, with the ZIP code of 59055, which opened on 4 January 1883.

== History ==
Located 20 miles north of Big Timber, Melville was established in 1877 as a village named after Rear Admiral George Melville, the Arctic explorer. A post office first went into operation in Melville in 1883, and the first Lutheran congregation in Montana was established there in 1885. Until a church was built in 1914, all services were held in the schoolhouse. Melville is a ranching community, originally settled by Norwegians. It became a regional meeting place for Saturday night dances, horse races, and gambling.

At its height, Melville had a flourmill, a cheese factory, a hotel, at least four saloons, two stores and a drug store. The railroad in Big Timber made such luxuries as dried fruits and green coffee available.

Melville is situated along the Sweet Grass Creek. The town provides supplies for the sheep camps in the Crazy Mountains and is the headquarters of the Cremer Stock Ranch.

== Climate ==
The Köppen Climate System classifies the weather as humid continental, abbreviated as Dfb.

Climate data for Melville, Montana, 1991–2020 normals, extremes 1961–present
Month	Jan	Feb	Mar	Apr	May	Jun	Jul	Aug	Sep	Oct	Nov	Dec	Year
Record high °F (°C)	65 (18)	65 (18)	73 (23)	79 (26)	85 (29)	92 (33)	101 (38)	96 (36)	91 (33)	82 (28)	74 (23)	63 (17)	101 (38)
Mean maximum °F (°C)	54.3 (12.4)	54.6 (12.6)	61.4 (16.3)	70.6 (21.4)	76.6 (24.8)	82.0 (27.8)	87.1 (30.6)	86.5 (30.3)	83.2 (28.4)	74.4 (23.6)	62.5 (16.9)	53.7 (12.1)	88.5 (31.4)
Mean daily maximum °F (°C)	34.6 (1.4)	34.8 (1.6)	42.2 (5.7)	49.3 (9.6)	58.1 (14.5)	66.3 (19.1)	75.7 (24.3)	75.2 (24.0)	66.0 (18.9)	52.9 (11.6)	41.2 (5.1)	33.9 (1.1)	52.5 (11.4)
Daily mean °F (°C)	23.8 (−4.6)	23.8 (−4.6)	30.9 (−0.6)	37.7 (3.2)	46.2 (7.9)	54.0 (12.2)	61.5 (16.4)	60.3 (15.7)	52.3 (11.3)	40.7 (4.8)	30.1 (−1.1)	23.3 (−4.8)	40.4 (4.6)
Mean daily minimum °F (°C)	13.0 (−10.6)	12.8 (−10.7)	19.6 (−6.9)	26.0 (−3.3)	34.3 (1.3)	41.6 (5.3)	47.2 (8.4)	45.4 (7.4)	38.5 (3.6)	28.5 (−1.9)	19.1 (−7.2)	12.6 (−10.8)	28.2 (−2.1)
Mean minimum °F (°C)	−13.9 (−25.5)	−11.5 (−24.2)	−4.3 (−20.2)	9.6 (−12.4)	20.5 (−6.4)	31.0 (−0.6)	38.7 (3.7)	34.8 (1.6)	25.4 (−3.7)	7.9 (−13.4)	−5.3 (−20.7)	−12.1 (−24.5)	−24.4 (−31.3)
Record low °F (°C)	−42 (−41)	−45 (−43)	−31 (−35)	−12 (−24)	7 (−14)	24 (−4)	31 (−1)	23 (−5)	10 (−12)	−12 (−24)	−26 (−32)	−45 (−43)	−45 (−43)
Average precipitation inches (mm)	0.53 (13)	0.65 (17)	1.08 (27)	2.47 (63)	3.59 (91)	3.54 (90)	1.92 (49)	1.38 (35)	1.66 (42)	1.52 (39)	0.84 (21)	0.60 (15)	19.78 (502)
Average precipitation days (≥ 0.01 in)	4.8	6.1	7.2	10.5	13.3	13.2	10.6	8.8	7.7	7.5	5.6	5.1	100.4
Source 1: NOAA
Source 2: National Weather Service
