= Charles McDonnell (Montana politician) =

American politician (1850–1928)

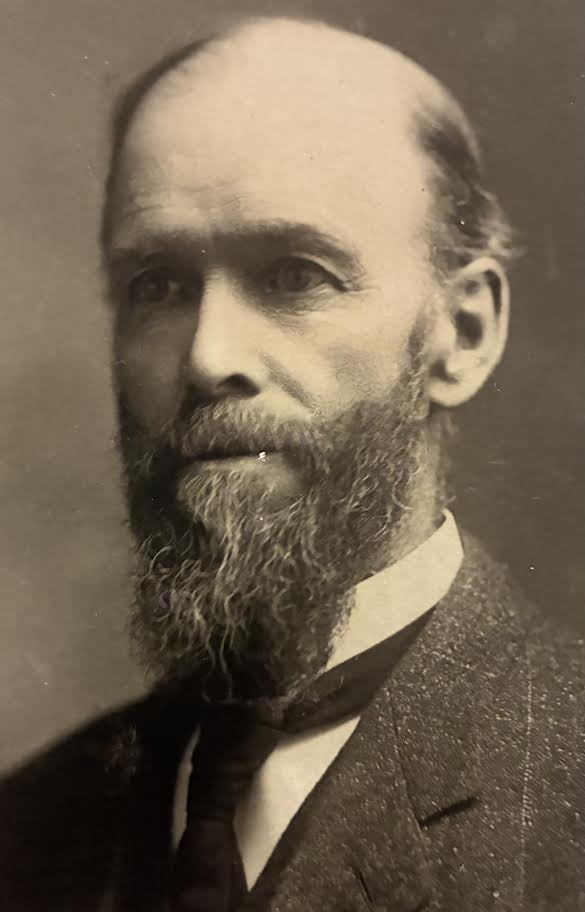
- McDonnell in 1909

Member of the Montana Senate from the 17th district
- In office January 2, 1905 – January 6, 1913

Chairman of Citizens Bank & Trust Co.
- In office 1927 – May 7, 1928
- Preceded by: Office Established

President of Citizens State Bank
- In office 1906–1927
- Preceded by: Office Established
- Succeeded by: Anthony H. Arneson

Personal details
- Born: April 16, 1850 Ballycastle, County Mayo, Ireland
- Died: May 7, 1928 (aged 78) Big Timber, Montana, U.S.
- Party: Republican
- Spouse: Elizabeth Feeley (1881–1928)
- Children: 6 (Including Ronald)
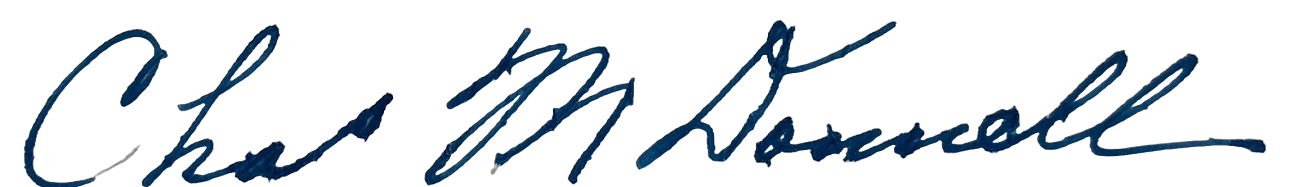
- Signature

Charles "Chas" McDonnell (April 16, 1850 – May 7, 1928) was an Irish-American politician, businessman, banker and sheepherder who was a Republican member of the Montana Legislature. He was elected to the Montana Senate in 1904 to represent Senate District 17, which at the time included Sweet Grass County. McDonnell served two consecutive terms as a Senator, retiring from the role in 1913. McDonnell also founded Citizens Bank & Trust Co. and served as its president from 1906 until 1927 when he became chairman of the board of directors.

== Pioneering ==
In 1870 he left Ireland for California. While in California he met Edward Veasley, and the two banded together 3,200 head of sheep. In 1880 he and Veasley traversed the Rocky Mountains and made their way to Montana. After a harsh winter from 1880–1881 he and Veasley were left with 727 of their original 3,200 sheep.

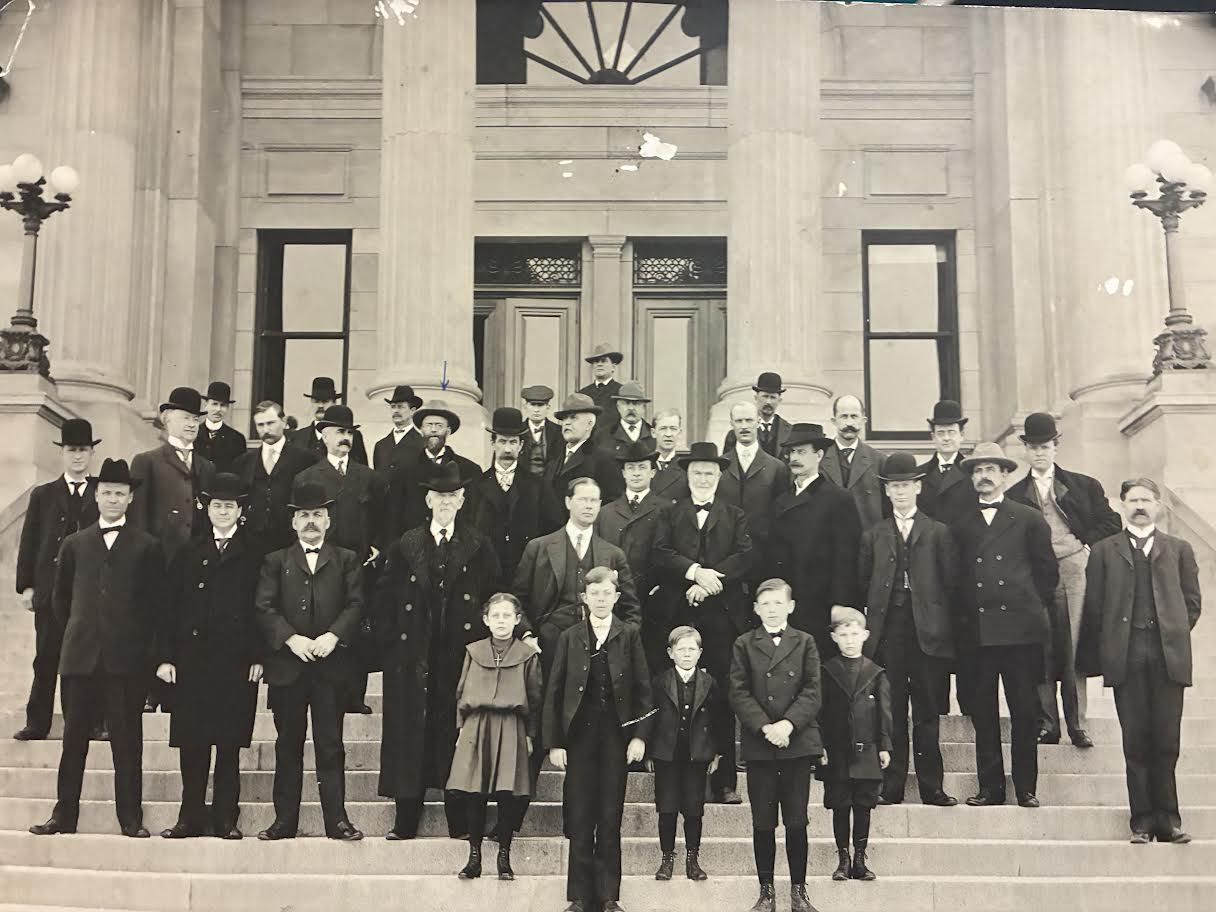
10th Montana State Senate, 1907

During the winter of 1880-'81 McDonnell recorded mercury at 40 below and stated this was the first time he had ever seen a sheep's nose bleed from excessive cold. On August 4, 1881, they established a permanent camp at the head of America Fork, locating what is now the famous cattle ranch of Maj. Wallis Huidekope. He accumulated around 11,000 acres of land on American Fork and near Big Elk. He also became the first person to run sheep into Sweet Grass County, giving rise to the name of the Sweet Grass County High School Sheep Herders.

At one time he ran almost 18,000 sheep throughout the county, around the same time the county received the title as the number one wool producer in the United States.

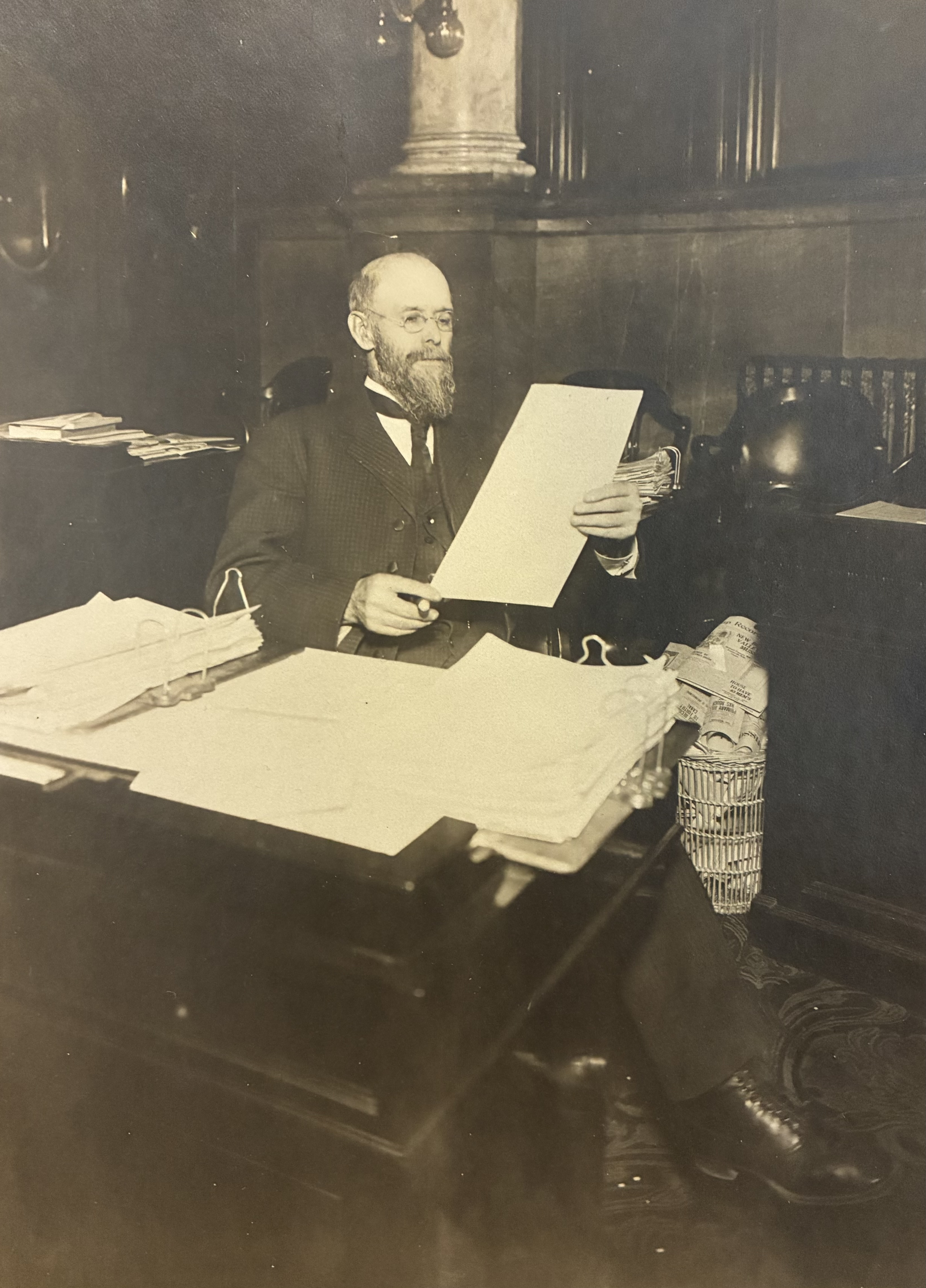
McDonnell at his desk, 1912

== Political career ==
In 1904, McDonnell was elected as a Senator to the Montana Senate. He would represent Sweet Grass County in the 9th, 10th, 11th, 12th, and 13th Senate sessions. In the 9th Senate he served alongside former Montana Territory Governor Benjamin F. White, to whom he would become good friends. He was renominated to serve a second term in 1908.

== Personal life ==
McDonnell married Elizabeth Feeley in 1881 and they had six children: Ronald, Charlie, Ann, Edith, Evelyn and Mary Belle. Evelyn died in 1918 after contracting the Spanish flu at the young age of 19, being the only child McDonnell would out live. McDonnell has only two known grand-children, Mary Ellen "Mimi" Cremer(Ronald's daughter) and Chuck Grady(Mary Belle's son). Chuck was the only one McDonnell would live to meet, being born in 1920, while Mimi was born in 1946.

In 1907 he settled his family in Big Timber. While living in Big Timber he purchased the Grand hotel, Budd block, occupied by the Phillips Durg Co., building occupied by the Loftgaarden plumbing shop, the old Busha & Bailey building, now occupied by the E. R. Patteson hardware; and several years later built the Golden Rule store building and building occupied by H. E. Mjelde and George Mosby, in the rear of the Golden Rule.

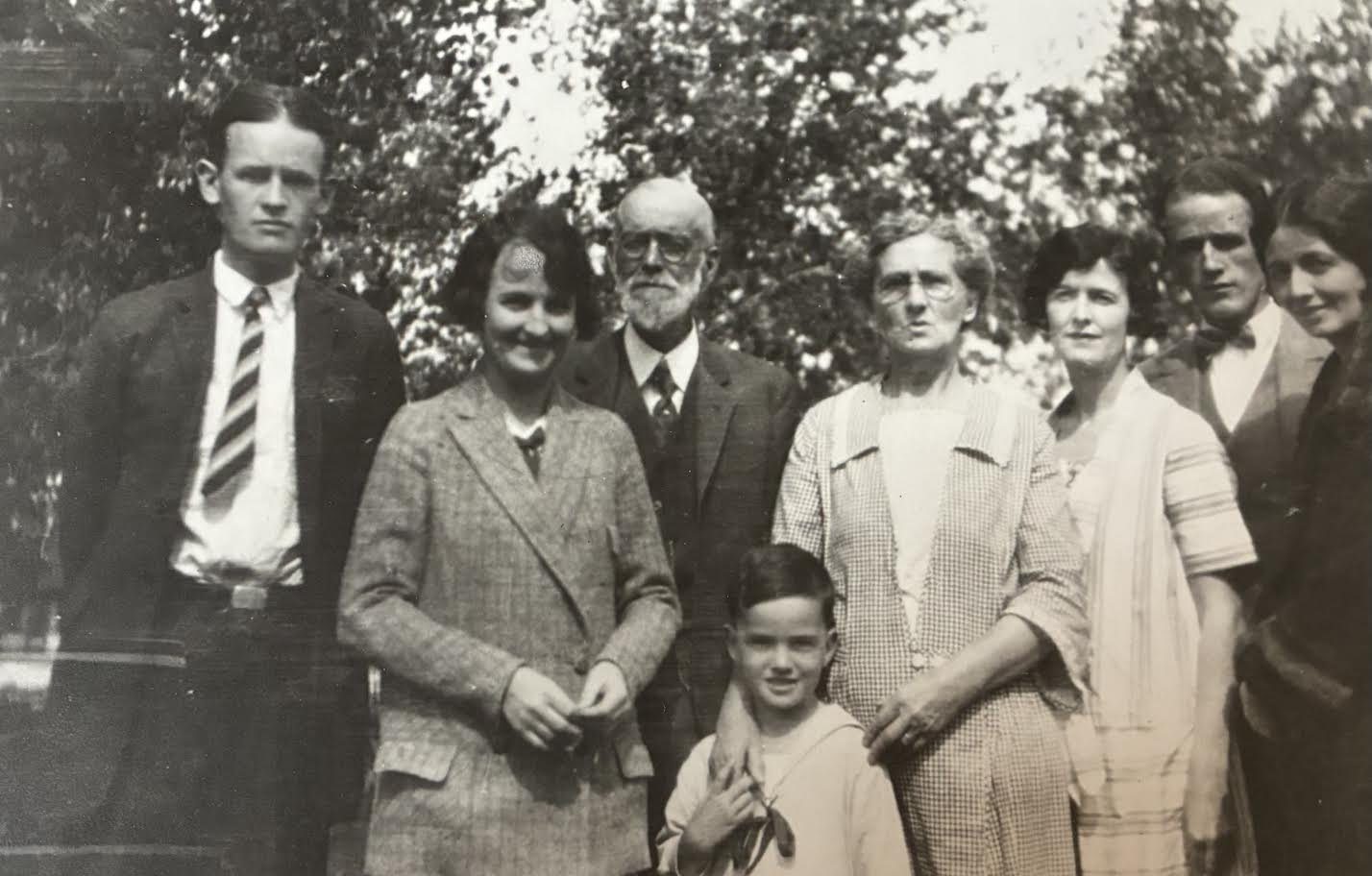
McDonnell Family Photo 1926, from left to right, Charlie, Ann, Charles, Chuck Grady(son of Mary Belle), Elizabeth, Mary Belle, Ron, and Edith

In 1906 he was the principle founder of the Citizens State Bank (which later merged with Commercial Bank & Trust Company to become Citizens Bank & Trust Company), serving as its president until 1927 when it was consolidated. He then transitioned to the role of chairman of the board of directors and would remain in that role until his death in 1928. His son Ron would also go on to serve as the Chairman of Citizens Bank, and his granddaughter, Mimi, is currently serving as the Chair. On top of serving as chairman, Ron also served in the Montana Legislature for 16 years. McDonnell also served as a member of the board of trustees of School District No. 1, and of the county high school; and as an alderman from the Second ward.

McDonnell returned from a trip to California on May 6, 1928, and told people he felt in good health. On his way home he felt nauseous and rested as soon as he got home. At around 11:00 PM medical assistance arrived at McDonnell's house. He died in the early hours of May 7, 1928. His cause of death was listed as apoplexy.

== Images ==
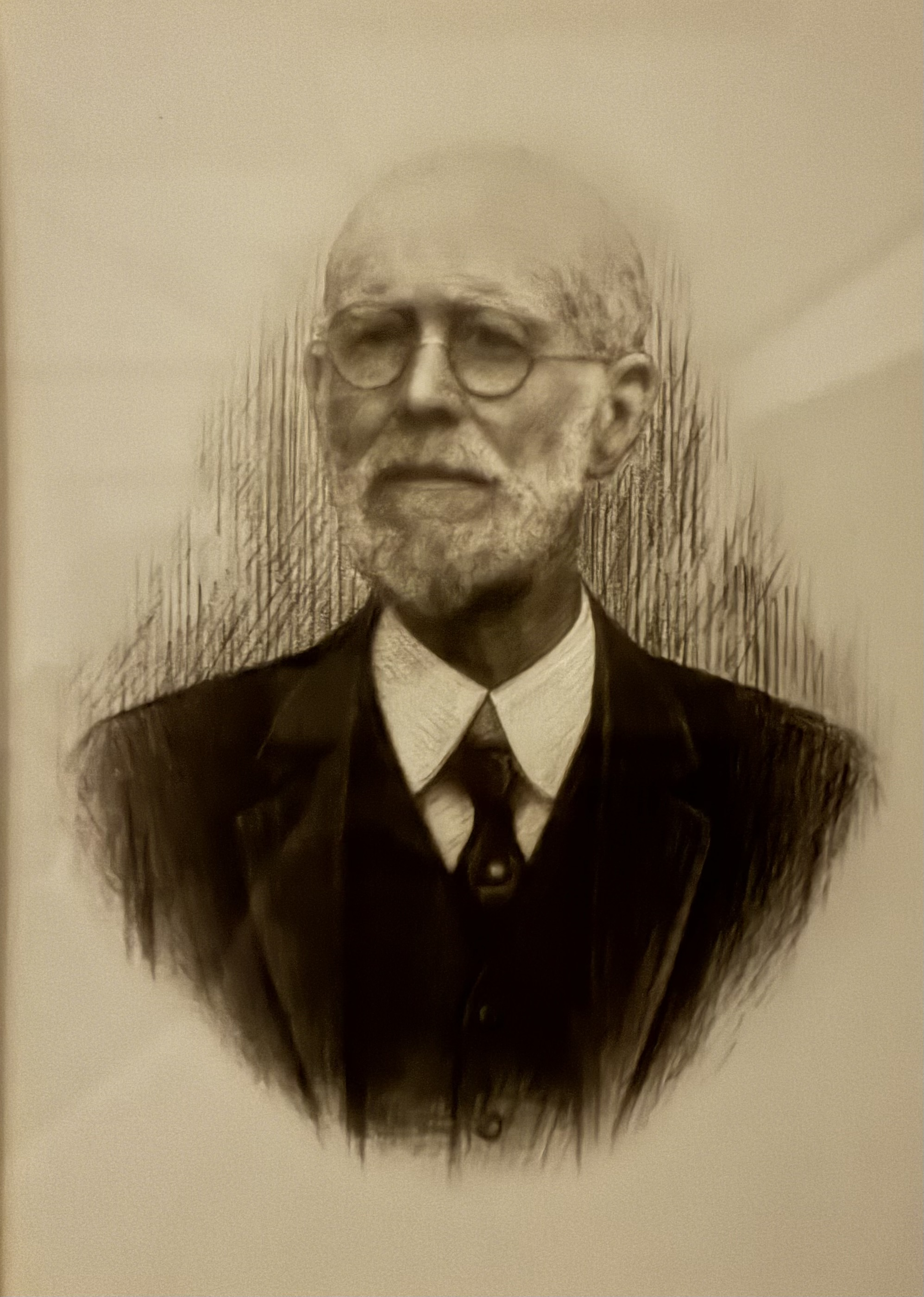
McDonnell's final portrait

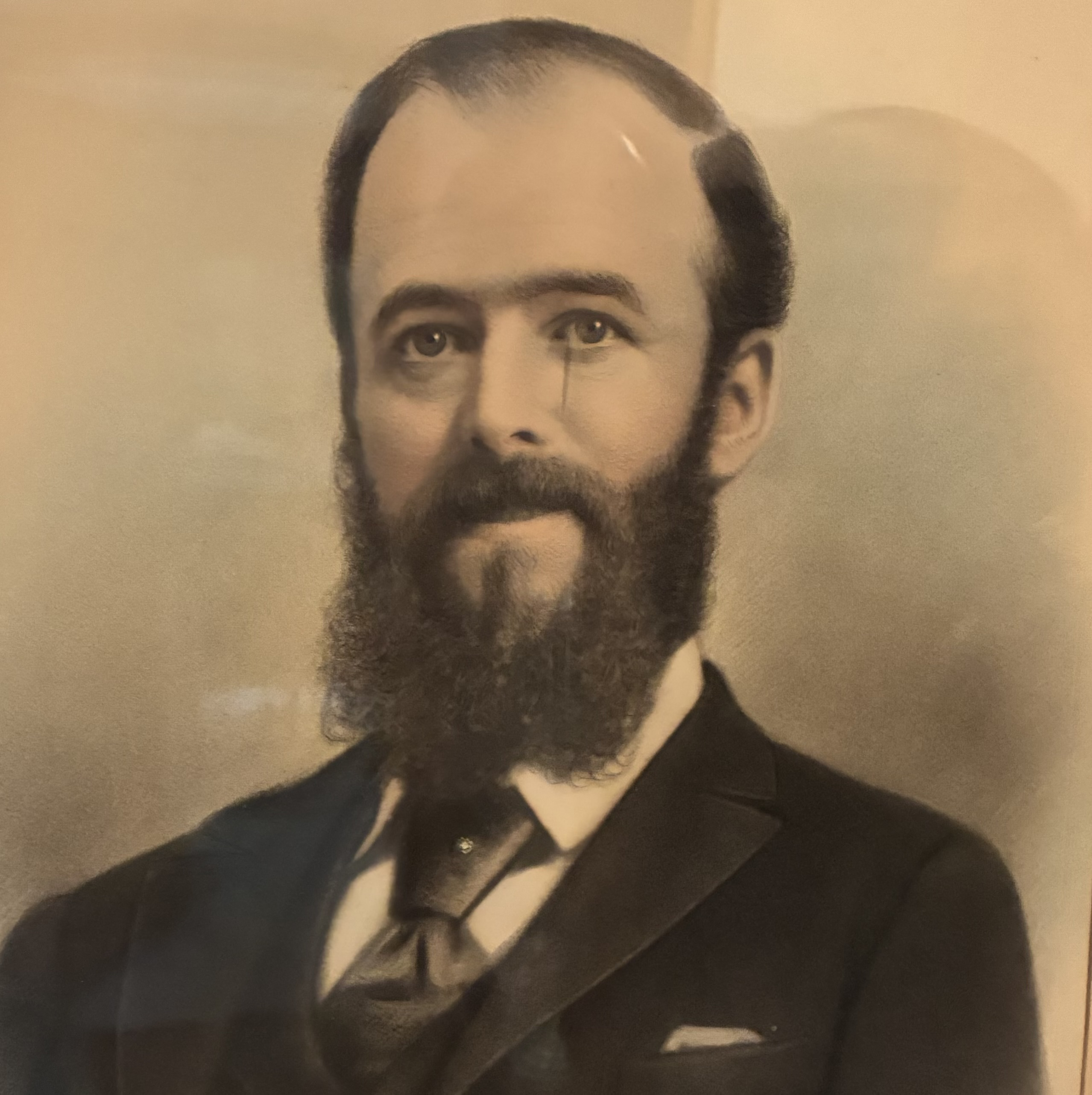
McDonnell's first portrait, 1904

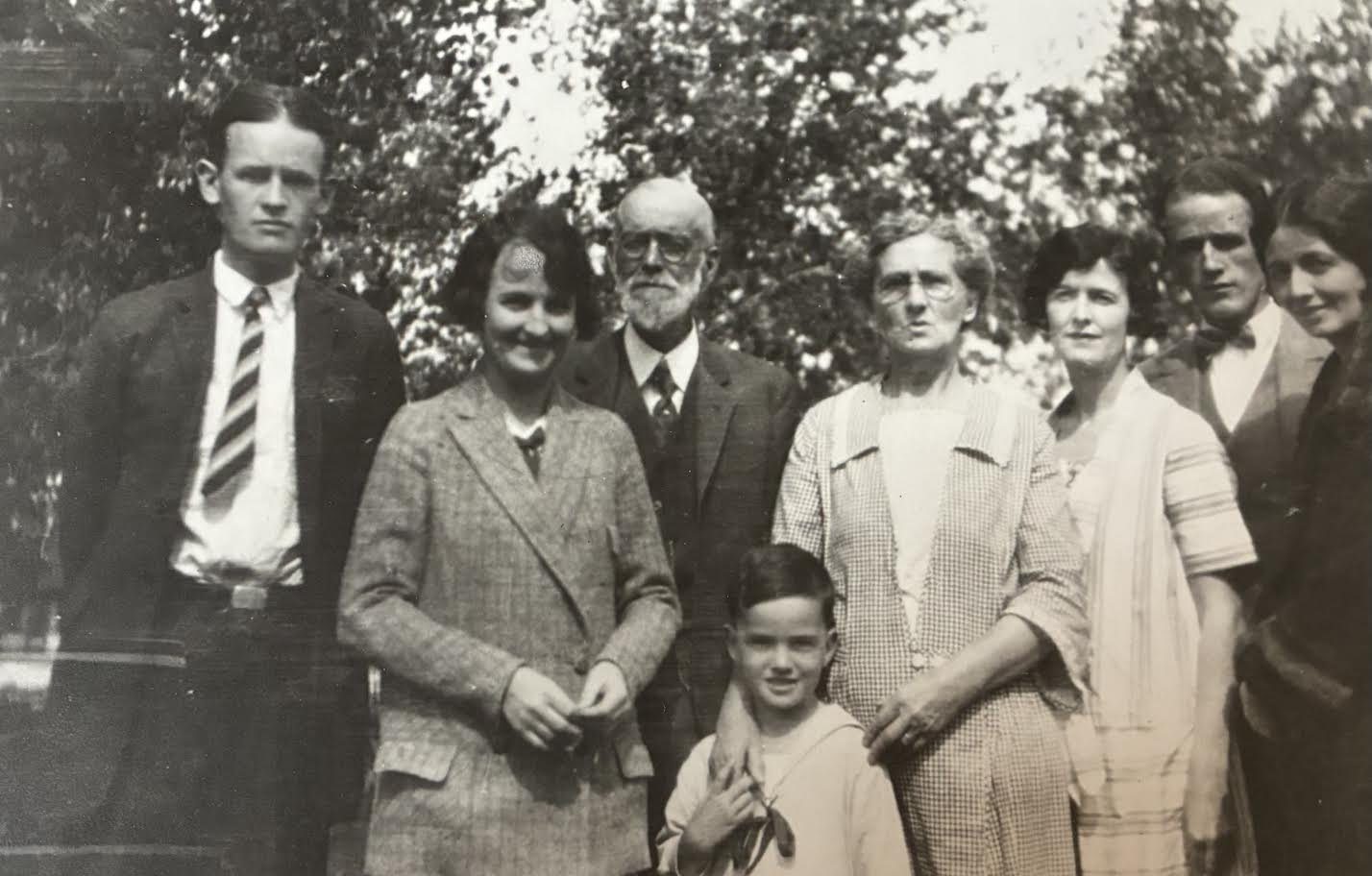
From Right to Left: Charlie, Ann, Charles, Chuck Grady, Elizabeth, Mary Belle, Ronald, Edith

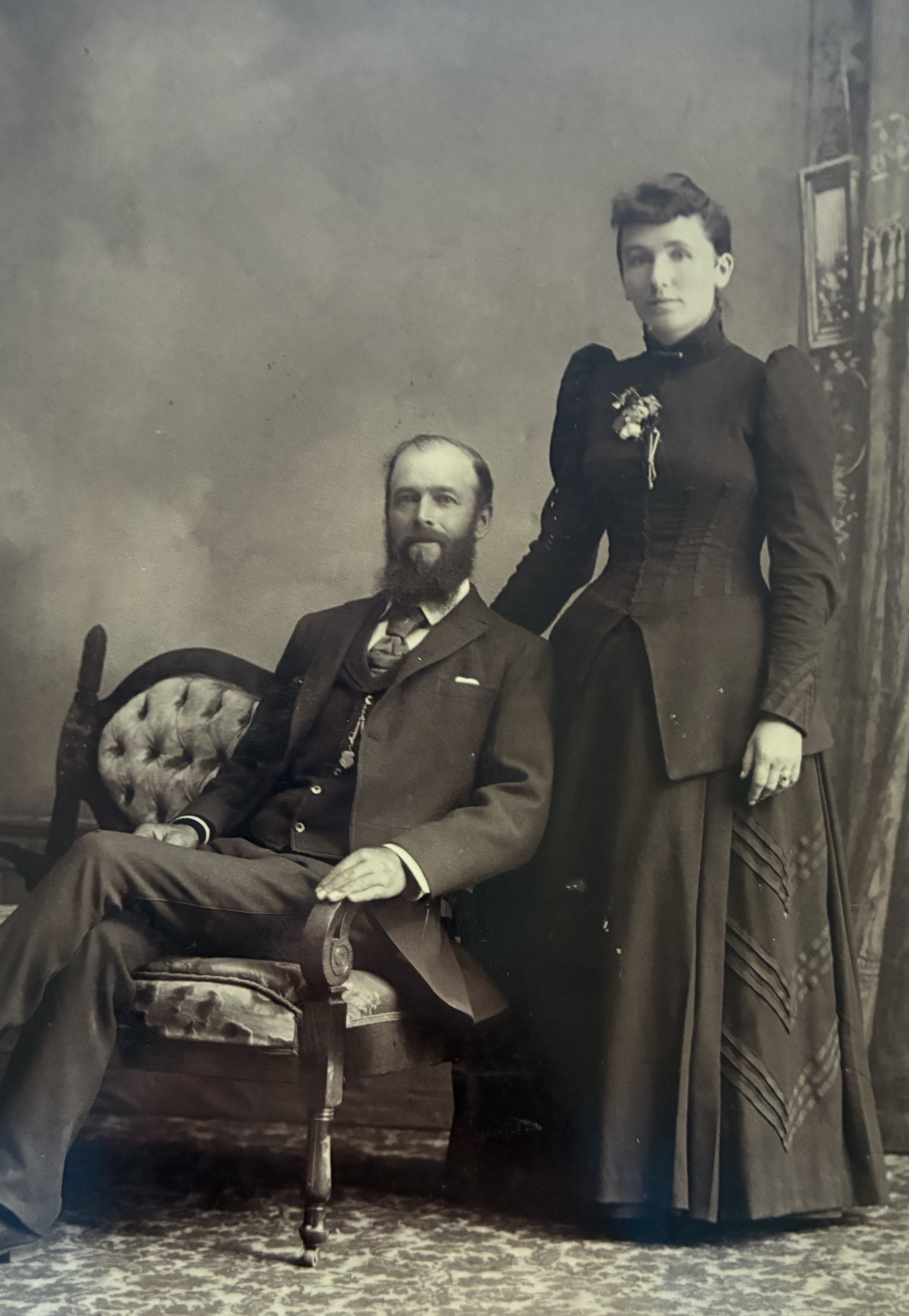
Charles and Elizabeth
