= Carney (surname) =

Carney is a surname of two possible Irish origins: Anglicisation of Ó Cearnaigh and truncation of McCarney (Mac Cearnaigh). Notable people with the surname include:

- Alan Carney (1909–1973), American actor and comedian
- Art Carney (1918–2003), American actor best known for playing Ed Norton on The Honeymooners
- Augustus Carney (1870–1920), American actor
- Charles J. Carney (1913–1987), United States congressman and Ohio state senator
- Charles Carney (Jacobite) (died 1693), an Irish soldier of the 17th century
- Brian Carney (rugby) (born 1976), Irish rugby league and rugby union footballer
- Brian Carney (editorialist), American journalist
- Chris Carney (born 1959), American politician, Democratic congressman from Pennsylvania
- Dan and Frank Carney, American businessmen, founders of Pizza Hut
- Daniel Carney (1944–1987), Rhodesian novelist
- David Carney (born 1983), Australian footballer
- Debra Carney, American mathematics educator
- Forrest Avery Carney (born 1992), American singer-songwriter
- Gene Carney (1895–1952), English footballer
- George Carney (1887–1947), British actor
- Harry Carney (1910–1974), American jazz musician
- Jack Carney (baseball) (1866–1925), American professional baseball player
- Jay Carney (born 1965), White House press secretary
- Jeffrey Carney, former United States Air Force intelligence specialist convicted of spying for East Germany
- John Carney (American football) (born 1964), American football placekicker
- John Carney (director) (born 1972), Irish film and TV director
- John Carney (magician) (born 1958), American sleight-of-hand artist, author and actor
- John "Bam" Carney (born 1969), American politician, member of the Kentucky House of Representatives
- John Carney (born 1956), American politician, U.S. Representative, governor of Delaware, mayor of Wilmington
- Julia Carney (1823–1908; pseudonym "Minnie May"), American educator, poet
- Justin Carney (born 1988), Australian rugby league footballer
- Karen Carney (born 1987), English football player
- Laurel H. Carney (born 1961), an American engineer and neuroscientist who conducts research on the auditory system.
- Keith Carney (born 1970), American ice hockey player
- Mark Carney (born 1965), economist, prime minister of Canada since 2025
- Mark Carney (American football) (born 1980), American football coach
- Mike Carney (born 1966), Canadian alpine skier
- Pat Carney (1935–2023), Canadian senator
- Patrick Carney (born 1980), American drummer of The Black Keys
- Ralph Carney (1956–2017), American musician
- Reeve Carney (born 1983), American musician and actor
- Rodney Carney (born 1984), American basketball player
- Ray Carney, American film theoretician
- Scott Carney (born 1978), American investigative journalist
- Steve Carney (1957–2013), English footballer
- Susan M. Carney (born 1962), American jurist
- Thomas Carney (1824–1888), 2nd Governor of Kansas
- Thomas M. Carney (1929–1964), American politician
- Todd Carney (born 1986), Australian rugby league footballer
- William Carney (1942–2017), American member of the United States House of Representatives from New York
- William Harvey Carney (1840–1908), American Civil War soldier and the first African American to earn the Medal of Honor
- Robert Carney (1895–1990), U. S. Navy admiral

== People with the surname by title ==
- Governor Carney (disambiguation)
- Judge Carney (disambiguation)
- Justice Carney (disambiguation)
- Senator Carney (disambiguation)

== See also ==
- Carney (disambiguation)
- Kearney (disambiguation)
- Kearny (disambiguation)
- Carny, informal term used for a traveling carnival operators and their employees
