= Carney =

Carney may refer to:

== People ==
- Carney (surname)
  - Mark Carney, current Prime Minister of Canada
- Governor Carney (disambiguation)
- Judge Carney (disambiguation)
- Justice Carney (disambiguation)
- Senator Carney (disambiguation)
- A carnival worker
- A traveling carnival worker

== Places ==
=== In the United States ===
- Carney, Maryland
- Carney, Michigan
- Carney, Montana
- Carney, Oklahoma
- Carney, West Virginia
- Carney Hospital, Dorchester, Boston, Massachusetts, USA; a hospital in New England

=== In the Republic of Ireland ===
- Carney, County Sligo
- Carney, County Tipperary

== Arts, entertainment, media ==
- A carnival (carney)
- A traveling carnival
- Carney (Cross Canadian Ragweed album)
- Carney (Leon Russell album), 1972

== Other uses ==
- USS Carney, US Navy ship

== See also ==
- Kearney (disambiguation), alternative transliteration from Irish
- Kearny (disambiguation)
- Carny (disambiguation)
- Carnival (disambiguation)
