= Mairin =

Mairin or Máirín may refer to

== People ==
- Máirín Cregan (1891–1975), an Irish nationalist and writer
- Mairin Mitchell (1895–1986), an Anglo-Irish writer
- Máirín de Burca (born 1938), an Irish journalist
- Máirín Ní Ghadhra, an Irish broadcaster
- Máirín Nic Eoin, an Irish academic

== Other ==
- Betulinic acid (alternative name)
