= McLarney =

McLarney is a surname. Notable people with the surname include:

- Art McLarney (1908–1984), American baseball player
- Terrence McLarney, American police officer

== See also ==
- McCarney
