= Irish people =

Ethnic group native to the island of Ireland

Muintir na hÉireann (Irish)

Total population
- c. 70–80 million worldwide

Regions with significant populations
- Republic of Ireland 5,149,139 (2022); Northern Ireland 627,814 (2021) (Note: 2021 census, Irish alone and other national identifications)
- United States: 36,000,000 (self-identified, figure includes both Irish nationals and expats living in America, along with Americans that have either primary or partial Irish ancestry)
- United Kingdom (excl. NI): 14,000,000 (650,000 first generation)
- Australia: 7,000,000
- Canada: 4,627,000
- New Zealand: 600,000
- Argentina: 500,000
- Chile: 120,000
- Germany: 35,000
- France: 20,000–24,000
- Netherlands: 11,308 (2021)
- Colombia: 10,000

Languages
- Irish (Note: Historical and native); English (Hiberno-English dialects) (Note: Dominant); Scots (Ulster Scots dialects); Irish Sign; Northern Ireland Sign

Religion
- Predominantly Roman Catholicism; minority Protestantism: Presbyterianism, Anglicanism, Methodism); See also: Religion in Ireland

Related ethnic groups
- Irish Travellers, Gaels, Anglo-Irish, Bretons, Cornish, English, Icelanders, Manx, Scots, Ulster Scots, Welsh

The Irish are an ethnic group and nation native to the island of Ireland, who share a common ancestry, history and culture. There have been humans in Ireland for about 33,000 years, and it has been continually inhabited for more than 10,000 years (see Prehistoric Ireland). For most of Ireland's recorded history, the Irish have been primarily a Gaelic people (see Gaelic Ireland). From the 9th century, small numbers of Vikings settled in Ireland, becoming the Norse–Gaels. Anglo-Normans also conquered parts of Ireland in the 12th century, while England's 16th/17th century conquest and colonisation of Ireland brought many English and Lowland Scots to parts of the island, especially the north. Today, Ireland is made up of the Republic of Ireland (officially called Ireland) and Northern Ireland (a part of the United Kingdom). The people of Northern Ireland hold various national identities including Irish, British or some combination thereof.

The Irish have their own unique customs, language, music, dance, sports, cuisine and mythology. Although Irish (Gaeilge) was their main language in the past, today most Irish people speak English as their first language. Historically, the Irish nation was made up of kin groups or clans, and the Irish also had their own religion, law code, alphabet and style of dress.

There have been many notable Irish people throughout history. After Ireland's conversion to Christianity, Irish missionaries and scholars exerted great influence on Western Europe, and the Irish came to be seen as a nation of "saints and scholars". The 6th-century Irish monk and missionary Columbanus is regarded as one of the "fathers of Europe", followed by saints Cillian and Fergal. The scientist Robert Boyle is considered the "father of chemistry", and Robert Mallet one of the "fathers of seismology". Irish literature has produced famous writers in both Irish- and English-language traditions, such as Eoghan Rua Ó Súilleabháin, Dáibhí Ó Bruadair, Jonathan Swift, Oscar Wilde, W. B. Yeats, Samuel Beckett, James Joyce, Máirtín Ó Cadhain, Eavan Boland, and Seamus Heaney. Notable Irish explorers include Brendan the Navigator, Sir Robert McClure, Sir Alexander Armstrong, Sir Ernest Shackleton and Tom Crean. By some accounts, the first European child born in North America had Irish descent on both sides. Many presidents of the United States have had some Irish ancestry.

The population of Ireland is about 6.9 million, but it is estimated that 50 to 80 million people around the world have varying degrees of Irish ancestry. Historically, emigration from Ireland has been the result of conflict, famine and economic issues. People of Irish descent are found mainly in English-speaking countries, especially Great Britain, the United States, Canada, New Zealand and Australia. There are also significant numbers in Argentina, Mexico, Brazil and Germany. The United States has the most people of Irish descent, while in Australia those of Irish descent are a higher percentage of the population than in any other country outside Ireland. Many Icelanders have Irish and Scottish Gaelic ancestors due to transportation there as slaves by the Vikings during their settlement of Iceland.

== Origins and antecedents ==
=== Prehistoric and legendary ancestors ===
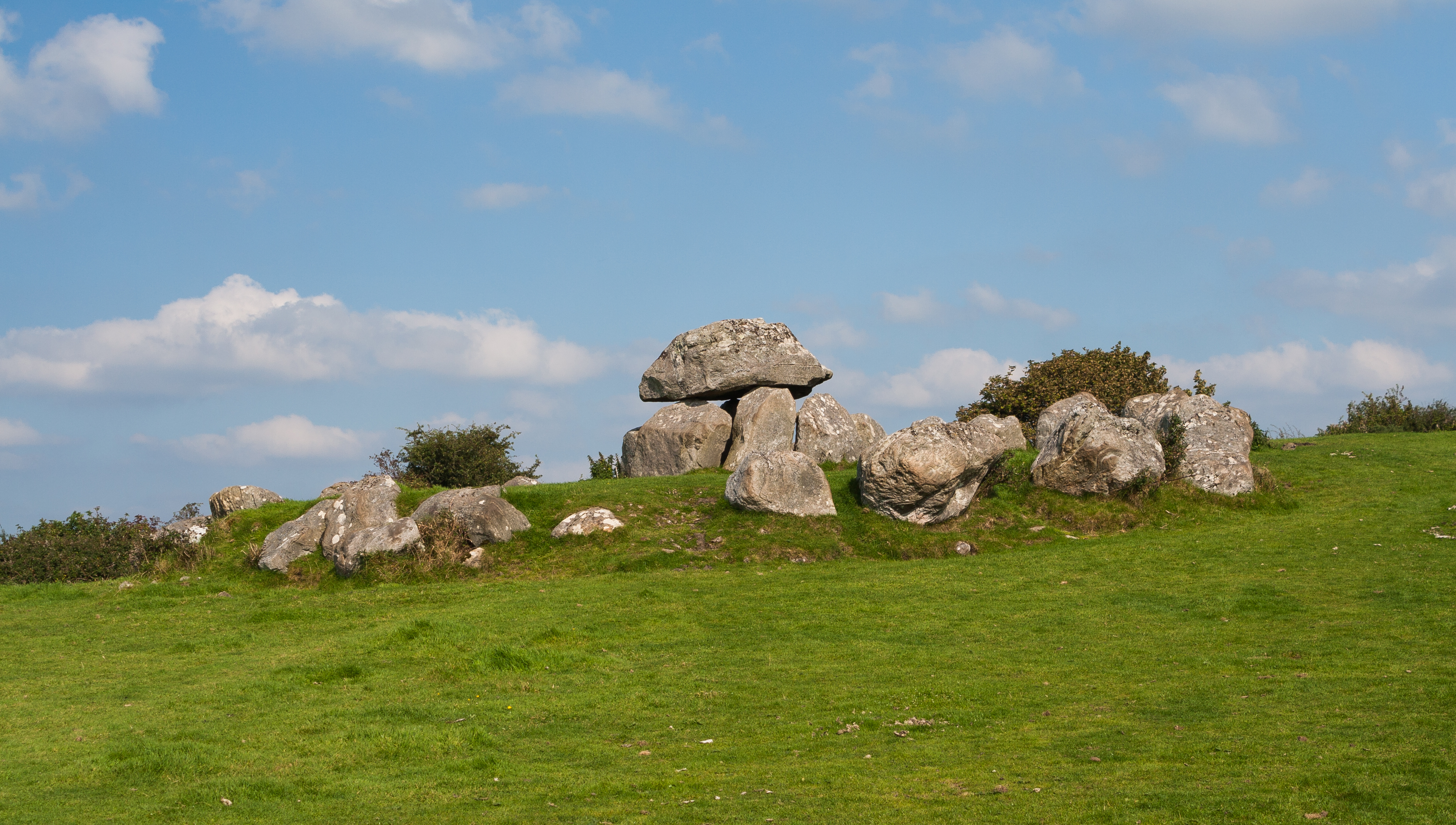
Carrowmore tomb, c. 3000 BC

During the past 33,000 years, Ireland has witnessed different peoples arrive on its shores.

Pytheas made a voyage of exploration to northwestern Europe in about 325 BC, but his account of it, known widely in Antiquity, has not survived and is now known only through the writings of others. On this voyage, he circumnavigated and visited a considerable part of modern-day Great Britain and Ireland. He was the first known scientific visitor to see and describe the Celtic and Germanic tribes.

The terms Irish and Ireland are probably derived from the goddess Ériu. A variety of tribal groups and dynasties have inhabited the island, including the Airgialla, Fir Ol nEchmacht, Delbhna, the mythical Fir Bolg, Érainn, Eóganachta, Mairtine, Conmaicne, Soghain, and Ulaid. In the cases of the Conmaicne, Delbhna, and perhaps Érainn, it can be demonstrated that the tribe took their name from their chief deity, or in the case of the Ciannachta, Eóganachta, and possibly the Soghain, a deified ancestor. This practice is paralleled by the Anglo-Saxon dynasties.

One legend states that the Irish were descended from the Milesians, who supposedly conquered Ireland around 1000 BC or later.

=== Genetics ===
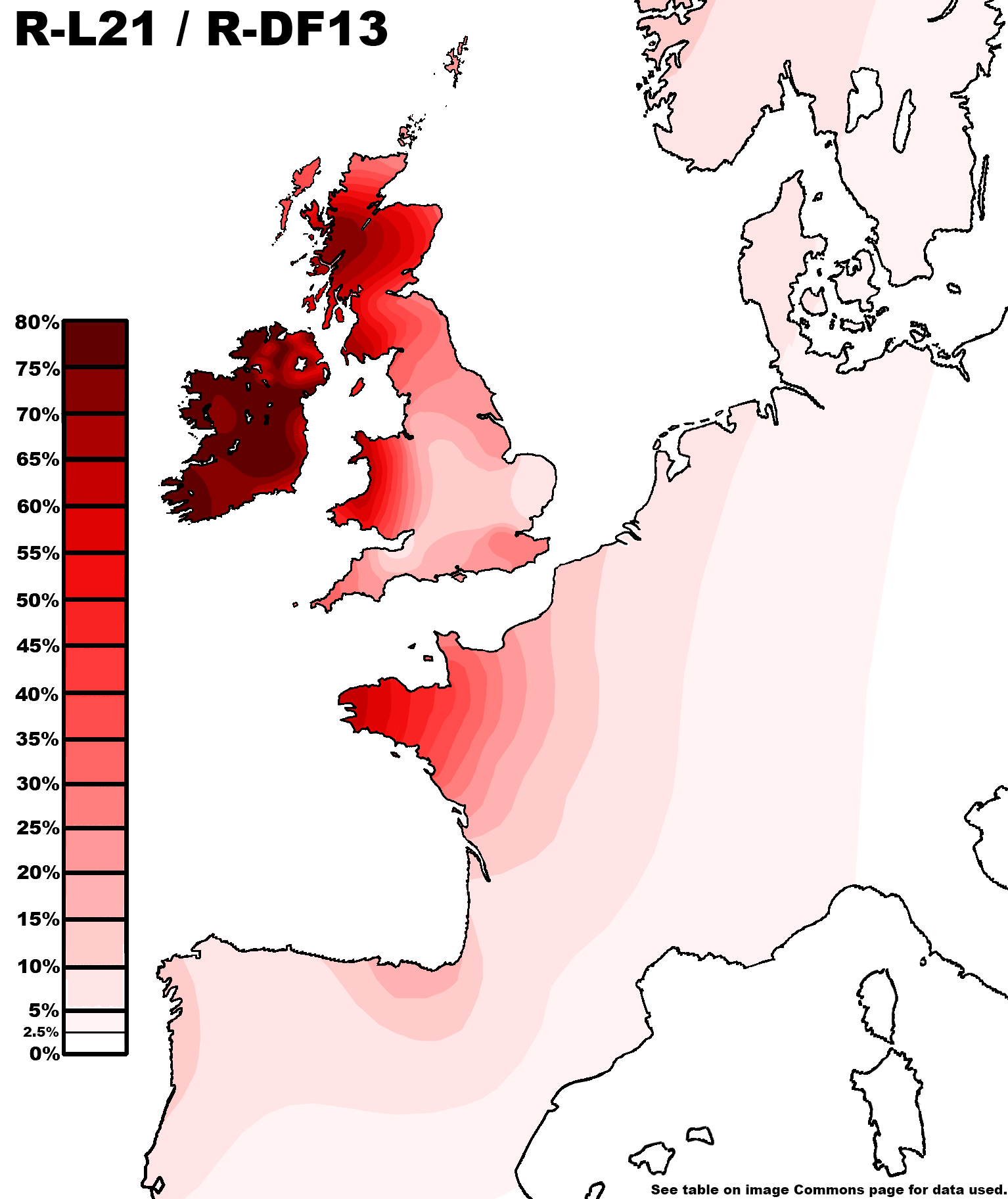
Distribution of Haplogroup R-L21 in Europe

The key traits of the Irish genome have been borne by people in Ireland since the early Bronze Age, around 4,000 years ago. The world's highest frequencies of the R-L21 Y-chromosome haplotype and lactase persistence (the ability to digest milk into adulthood) are found among people in Ireland.

Haplogroup R1b is the dominant haplogroup among Irish males, reaching a frequency of almost 80%. This is also the dominant haplogroup in most of Western Europe. R1b-L21 is the dominant sub-clade throughout Ireland, reaching a frequency of 65%. This subclade is also dominant in Scotland, Wales and Brittany and descends from a common ancestor who lived in about 2,500 BC.

Modern Irish people have a small amount of ancestry from the Early European Farmers who lived in Ireland during the Neolithic (New Stone Age). Irish people derive most of their ancestry from Western Steppe Herders who originally came from the Pontic–Caspian steppe and arrived in western Europe during the early Bronze Age.

A recent archaeogenetics study of ancient remains from Ireland found that the older Neolithic farming population was most similar to present-day Sardinians. Meanwhile, three Bronze Age men buried on Rathlin Island between 2000 and 1500 BC were most similar to present-day Irish people. They all belonged to Haplogroup R-L21 and had the gene for lactase persistence. This shows strong genetic continuity in Ireland from the Bronze Age to the modern era.

It is most likely that these Bronze Age people of the R-L21 haplogroup brought the Bell Beaker culture to Ireland, and it is suggested that they also brought an Indo-European language that was an ancestor to the Insular Celtic and Gaelic languages. Today, R-L21 is the dominant haplogroup throughout the island of Ireland as well as western Scotland, Wales and Brittany. It is therefore associated with the Insular Celtic peoples.

A 2017 genetic study shows that the Irish population can be divided into ten geographic genetic clusters; seven of 'Gaelic' Irish ancestry, and three of shared Irish-British ancestry. The differences between the 'Gaelic' clusters are small, and are "surprisingly faithful to the historical boundaries of Irish provinces and kingdoms". The largest difference is between native 'Gaelic' Irish populations and those of Ulster Protestants known to have recent, partial British ancestry. They were also found to have most similarity to two main ancestral sources: a 'Northwestern France' component which reached highest levels in the Irish and other Celtic populations (Welsh, Highland Scots and Cornish); and a 'West Norway' component related to the Viking era.

Irish people have the least amount of ancestry from the Anglo-Saxons in the British Isles at around 10%, which is significantly lower than their Celtic neighbours in Scotland and Wales who have got around 30% of their respective genomes being of Anglo-Saxon origin.

As of 2016, 10,100 Irish nationals of African descent referred to themselves as "Black Irish" in the national census. The term "Black Irish" is sometimes used outside Ireland to refer to Irish people with black hair and dark eyes. One theory is that they are descendants of Spanish traders or of the few sailors of the Spanish Armada who were shipwrecked on Ireland's west coast, but there is little evidence for this.

=== Irish Travellers ===
Irish Travellers are an ethnic people of Ireland. A DNA study found they originally descended from the general Irish population, however, they are now very distinct from it. The emergence of Travellers as a distinct group occurred long before the Great Famine, a genetic analysis shows. The research suggests that Traveller origins may in fact date as far back as 420 years to 1597. The Plantation of Ulster began around that time, with native Irish displaced from the land, perhaps to form a nomadic population.

== History ==
=== Early expansion and the coming of Christianity ===
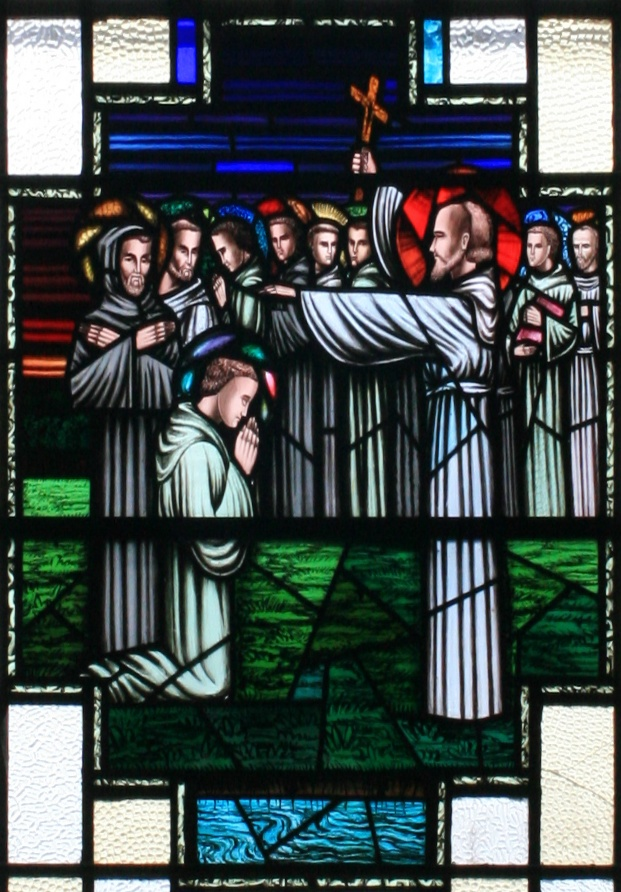
Finnian of Clonard imparting his blessing to the "Twelve Apostles of Ireland"

One Roman historian records that the Irish people were divided into "sixteen different nations" or tribes. Traditional histories assert that the Romans never attempted to conquer Ireland, although it may have been considered. The Irish were not, however, cut off from Europe; they frequently raided the Roman territories, and also maintained trade links.

Among the most famous people of ancient Irish history are the High Kings of Ireland, such as Cormac mac Airt and Niall of the Nine Hostages, and the semi-legendary Fianna. The 20th-century writer Seumas MacManus wrote that even if the Fianna and the Fenian Cycle were purely fictional, they would still be representative of the character of the Irish people:

...such beautiful fictions of such beautiful ideals, by themselves, presume and prove beautiful-souled people, capable of appreciating lofty ideals.

The introduction of Christianity to the Irish people during the 5th century brought a radical change to the Irish people's foreign relations. The only military raid abroad recorded after that century is a presumed invasion of Wales, which according to a Welsh manuscript may have taken place around the 7th century. In the words of Seumas MacManus:

If we compare the history of Ireland in the 6th century, after Christianity was received, with that of the 4th century, before the coming of Christianity, the wonderful change and contrast is probably more striking than any other such change in any other nation known to history.

Following the conversion of the Irish to Christianity, Irish secular laws and social institutions remained in place.

=== Migration and invasion in the Middle Ages ===
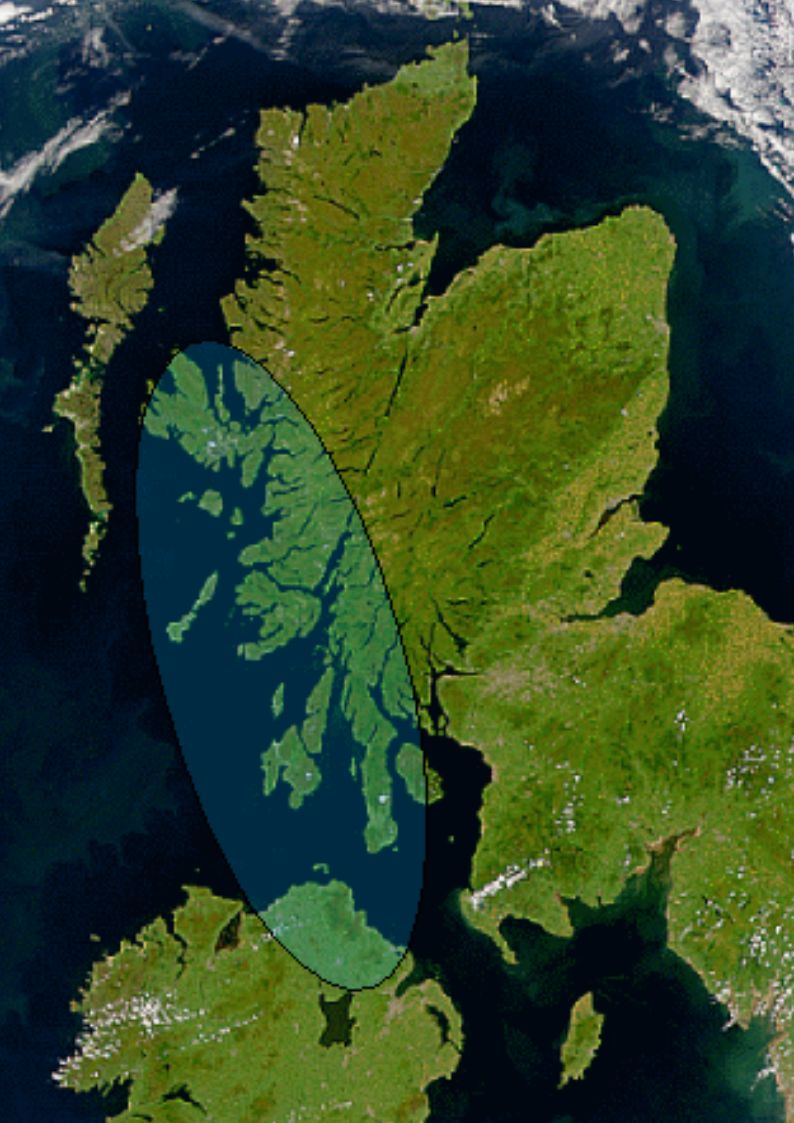
The approximate area of the Dál Riata (shaded)

The 'traditional' view is that, in the 4th or 5th century, Goidelic language and Gaelic culture was brought to Scotland by settlers from Ireland, who founded the Gaelic kingdom of Dál Riata on Scotland's west coast. This is based mostly on medieval writings from the 9th and 10th centuries. The archaeologist Ewan Campbell argues against this view, saying that there is no archaeological or placename evidence for a migration or a takeover by a small group of elites. He states that "the Irish migration hypothesis seems to be a classic case of long-held historical beliefs influencing not only the interpretation of documentary sources themselves but the subsequent invasion paradigm being accepted uncritically in the related disciplines of archaeology and linguistics." Dál Riata and the territory of the neighbouring Picts merged to form the Kingdom of Alba, and Goidelic language and Gaelic culture became dominant there. The country came to be called Scotland, after the Roman name for the Gaels: Scoti. The Isle of Man and the Manx people also came under massive Gaelic influence in their history.

Irish missionaries such as Saint Columba brought Christianity to Pictish Scotland. The Irishmen of this time were also "aware of the cultural unity of Europe", and it was the 6th-century Irish monk Columbanus who is regarded as "one of the fathers of Europe". Another Irish saint, Aidan of Lindisfarne, has been proposed as a possible patron saint of the United Kingdom, while Saints Kilian and Vergilius became the patron saints of Würzburg in Germany and Salzburg in Austria, respectively. Irish missionaries founded monasteries outside Ireland, such as Iona Abbey, the Abbey of St Gall in Switzerland, and Bobbio Abbey in Italy.

Common to both the monastic and the secular bardic schools were Irish and Latin. With Latin, the early Irish scholars "show almost a like familiarity that they do with their own Gaelic". There is also evidence that Hebrew and Greek were studied, with the latter probably being taught at Iona.

"The knowledge of Greek", says Professor Sandys in his History of Classical Scholarship, "which had almost vanished in the west was so widely dispersed in the schools of Ireland that if anyone knew Greek it was assumed he must have come from that country."'

Since the time of Charlemagne, Irish scholars had a considerable presence in the Frankish court, where they were renowned for their learning. The most significant Irish intellectual of the early monastic period was the 9th century Johannes Scotus Eriugena, an outstanding philosopher in terms of originality. He was the earliest of the founders of scholasticism, the dominant school of medieval philosophy. He had considerable familiarity with the Greek language, and translated many works into Latin, affording access to the Cappadocian Fathers and the Greek theological tradition, previously almost unknown in the Latin West.

The influx of Viking raiders and traders in the 9th and 10th centuries resulted in the founding of many of Ireland's most important towns, including Cork, Dublin, Limerick, and Waterford (earlier Gaelic settlements on these sites did not approach the urban nature of the subsequent Norse trading ports). The Vikings left little impact on Ireland other than towns and certain words added to the Irish language, but many Irish taken as slaves inter-married with the Scandinavians, hence forming a close link with the Icelandic people. In the Icelandic Laxdœla saga, for example, "even slaves are highborn, descended from the kings of Ireland." The first name of Njáll Þorgeirsson, the chief protagonist of Njáls saga, is a variation of the Irish name Neil. According to Eirik the Red's Saga, the first European couple to have a child born in North America was descended from the Viking Queen of Dublin, Aud the Deep-minded, and a Gaelic slave brought to Iceland.

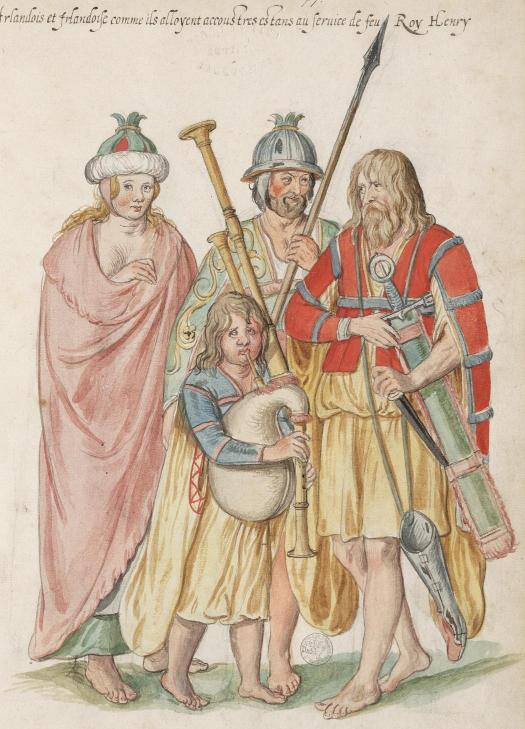
Irish Gaels in a painting from the 16th century

The arrival of the Anglo-Normans brought also the Welsh, Flemish, Anglo-Saxons, and Bretons. Most of these were assimilated into Irish culture and polity by the 15th century, with the exception of some of the walled towns and the Pale areas. The Late Middle Ages also saw the settlement of Scottish gallowglass families of mixed Gaelic-Norse and Pict descent, mainly in the north; due to similarities of language and culture they too were assimilated.

=== Surnames ===
The Irish were among the first people in Europe to use surnames as we know them today. It is very common for people of Gaelic origin to have the English versions of their surnames beginning with 'Ó' or 'Mac' (Over time however many have been shortened to 'O' or Mc). 'O' comes from the Irish Ó which in turn came from Ua, which means "grandson", or "descendant" of a named person. Mac is the Irish for son.

Names that begin with "O'" include: Ó Bánion (O'Banion), Ó Briain (O'Brien), Ó Ceallaigh (O'Kelly), Ó Conchobhair (O'Connor, O'Conor), Ó Chonaill (O'Connell), O'Coiligh (Cox), Ó Cuilinn (Cullen), Ó Deághaidh (O'Dea), Ó Domhnaill (O'Donnell), Ó Drisceoil (O'Driscoll), Ó Gríobhtha (Griffin), Ó hAnnracháin, (Hanrahan), Ó Máille (O'Malley), Ó Mathghamhna (O'Mahony), Ó Néill (O'Neill), Ó Sé (O'Shea), Ó Súilleabháin (O'Sullivan), Ó Caiside/Ó Casaide (Cassidy), Ó Brádaigh/Mac Bradaigh (Brady) and Ó Tuathail (O'Toole).

Names that begin with Mac or Mc include: Mac Cárthaigh (McCarthy), Mac Diarmada (McDermott), Mac Domhnaill (McDonnell), and Mac Mathghamhna (McMahon) Mac(g) Uidhir (Maguire), Mac Dhonnchadha (McDonagh), Mac Conmara (MacNamara), Mac Craith (McGrath), Mac Aodha (McGee), Mac Aonghuis (McGuinness), Mac Cana (McCann), Mac Lochlainn (McLaughlin) and Mac Conallaidh (McNally). Mac is commonly anglicised Mc. However, "Mac" and "Mc" are not mutually exclusive, so, for example, both "MacCarthy" and "McCarthy" are used. Both "Mac" and "Ó'" prefixes are both Irish in origin, Anglicized Prefix Mc is far more common in Ireland than Scotland with 2/3 of all Mc Surnames being Irish in origin However, "Mac" is more common in Scotland and Ulster than in the rest of Ireland; furthermore, "Ó" surnames are less common in Scotland having been brought to Scotland from Ireland. The proper surname for a woman in Irish uses the feminine prefix nic (meaning daughter) in place of mac. Thus a boy may be called Mac Domhnaill whereas his sister would be called Nic Dhomhnaill or Ní Dhomhnaill – the insertion of 'h' follows the female prefix in the case of most consonants (bar H, L, N, R, & T).

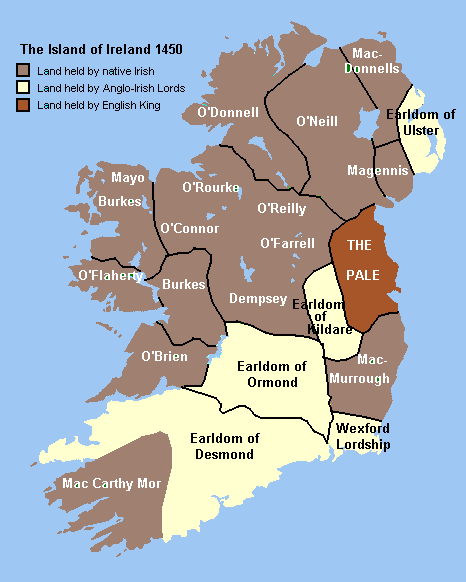
Ireland in 1450 showing lands held by native Irish (green), the Anglo-Irish (blue) and the English king (dark grey).

A son has the same surname as his father. A female's surname replaces Ó with Ní (reduced from Iníon Uí – "daughter of the grandson of") and Mac with Nic (reduced from Iníon Mhic – "daughter of the son of"); in both cases the following name undergoes lenition. However, if the second part of the surname begins with the letter C or G, it is not lenited after Nic. Thus the daughter of a man named Ó Maolagáin has the surname Ní Mhaolagáin and the daughter of a man named Mac Gearailt has the surname Nic Gearailt. When anglicised, the name can remain O' or Mac, regardless of gender.

There are a number of Irish surnames derived from Norse personal names, including Mac Suibhne (Sweeney) from Swein and McAuliffe from "Olaf". The name Cotter, local to County Cork, derives from the Norse personal name Ottir. The name Reynolds is an Anglicization of the Irish Mac Raghnaill, itself originating from the Norse names Randal or Reginald. Though these names were of Viking derivation some of the families who bear them appear to have had Gaelic origins.

"Fitz" is an old Norman French variant of the Old French word fils (variant spellings filz, fiuz, fiz, etc.), used by the Normans, meaning son. The Normans themselves were descendants of Vikings, who had settled in Normandy and thoroughly adopted the French language and culture. With the exception of the Gaelic-Irish Fitzpatrick (Mac Giolla Phádraig) surname, all names that begin with Fitz – including FitzGerald (Mac Gearailt), Fitzsimons (Mac Síomóin/Mac an Ridire) and FitzHenry (Mac Anraí) – are descended from the initial Norman settlers. A small number of Irish families of Goidelic origin came to use a Norman form of their original surname—so that Mac Giolla Phádraig became Fitzpatrick—while some assimilated so well that the Irish name was dropped in favour of a new, Hiberno-Norman form. Another common Irish surname of Norman Irish origin is the 'de' habitational prefix, meaning 'of' and originally signifying prestige and land ownership. Examples include de Búrca (Burke), de Brún, de Barra (Barry), de Stac (Stack), de Tiúit, de Faoite (White), de Londras (Landers), de Paor (Power). The Irish surname "Walsh" (in Irish Breathnach) was routinely given to settlers of Welsh origin, who had come during and after the Norman invasion. The Joyce and Griffin/Griffith (Gruffydd) families are also of Welsh origin.

The Mac Lochlainn, Ó Maol Seachlainn, Ó Maol Seachnaill, Ó Conchobhair, Mac Loughlin and Mac Diarmada families, all distinct, are now all subsumed together as MacLoughlin. The full surname usually indicated which family was in question, something that has been diminished with the loss of prefixes such as Ó and Mac. Different branches of a family with the same surname sometimes used distinguishing epithets, which sometimes became surnames in their own right. Hence the chief of the clan Ó Cearnaigh (Kearney) was referred to as An Sionnach (Fox), which his descendants use to this day. Similar surnames are often found in Scotland for many reasons, such as the use of a common language and mass Irish migration to Scotland in the late 19th and early to mid-20th centuries.

=== Late Medieval and Tudor Ireland ===
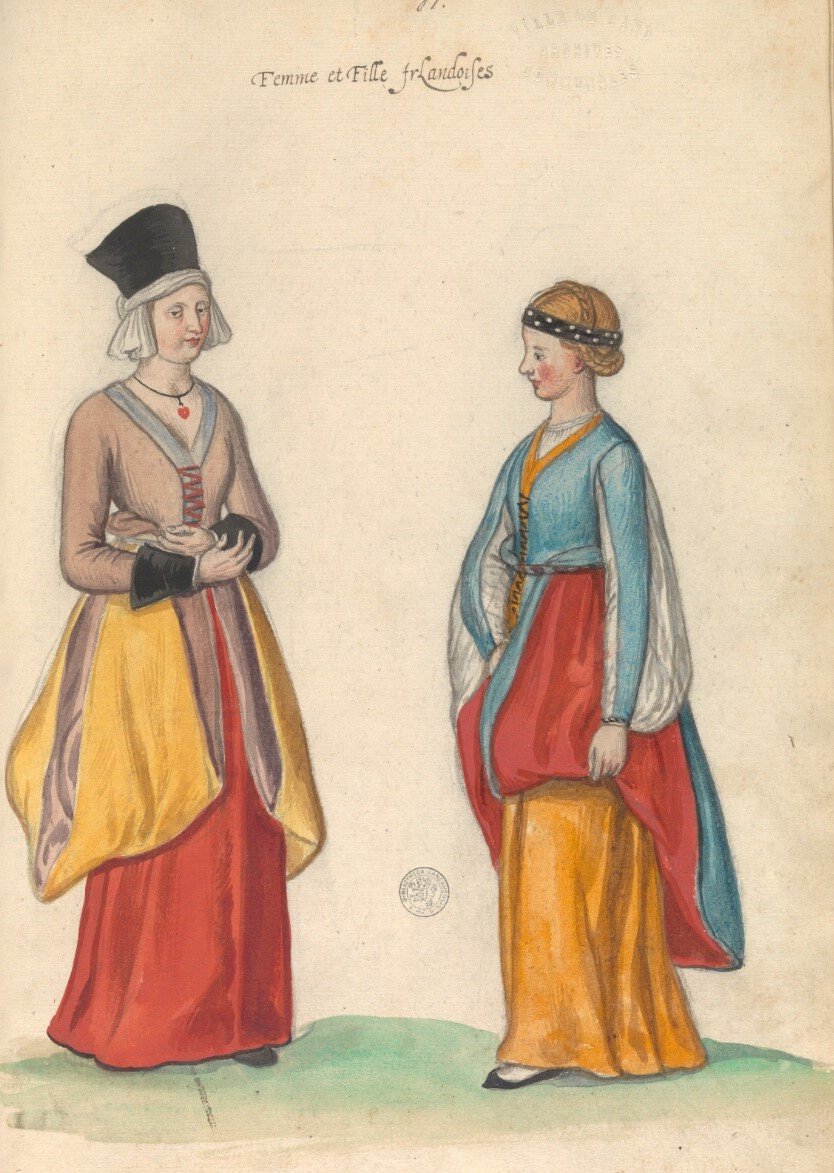
A 16th century perception of Irish women and girls, illustrated in the manuscript "Théâtre de tous les peuples et nations de la terre avec leurs habits et ornemens divers, tant anciens que modernes, diligemment depeints au naturel". Painted by Lucas d'Heere in the 2nd half of the 16th century. Preserved in the Ghent University Library.

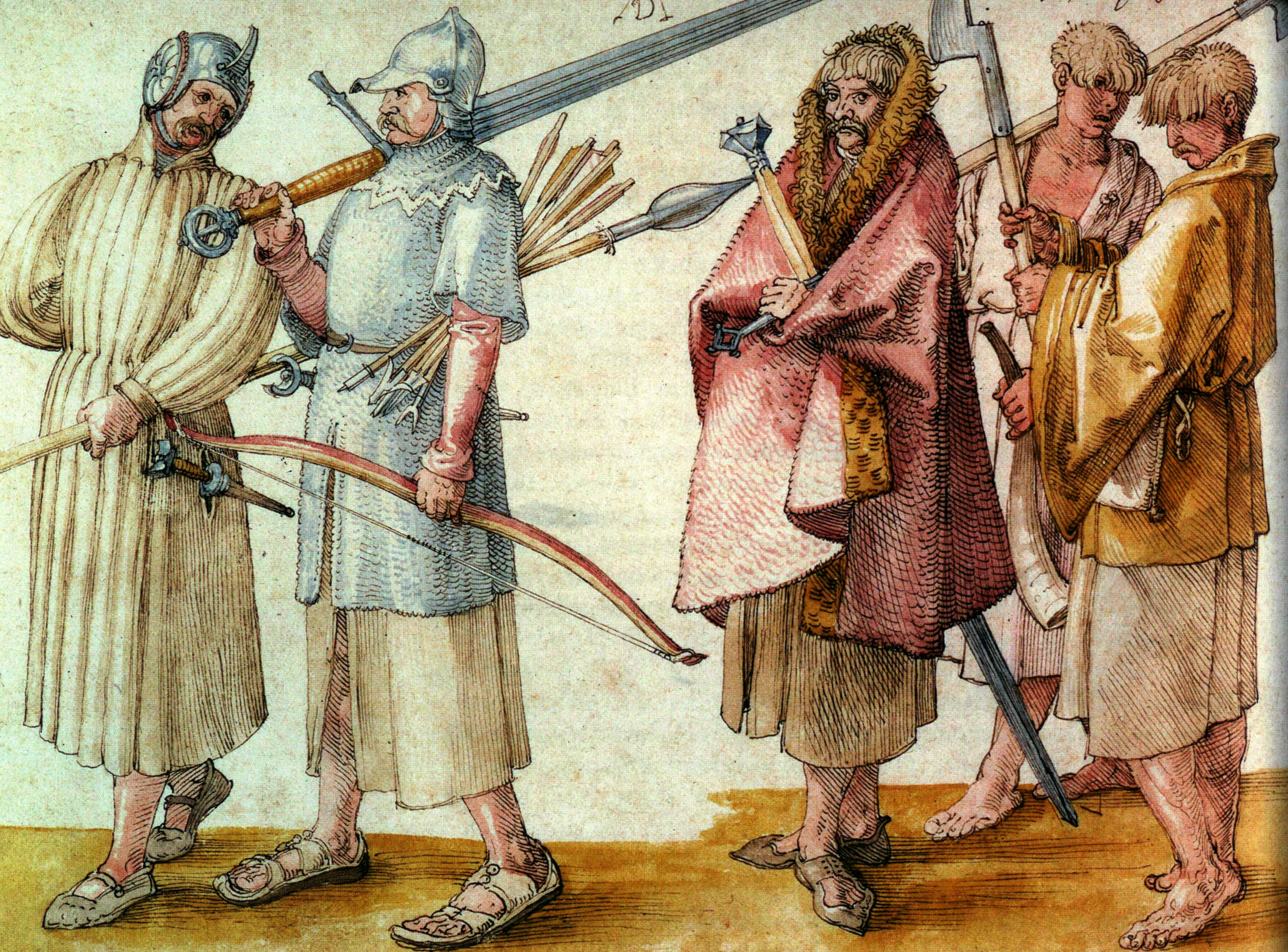
Gaelic Irish soldiers in the Low Countries, from a drawing of 1521 by Albrecht Dürer

The Irish people of the Late Middle Ages were active as traders on the European continent. They were distinguished from the English (who only used their own language or French) in that they only used Latin abroad—a language "spoken by all educated people throughout Gaeldom". According to the writer Seumas MacManus, the explorer Christopher Columbus visited Ireland to gather information about the lands to the west, a number of Irish names are recorded on Columbus' crew roster preserved in the archives of Madrid and it was an Irishman named Patrick Maguire who was the first to set foot in the Americas in 1492; however, according to Morison and Miss Gould, who made a detailed study of the crew list of 1492, no Irish or English sailors were involved in the voyage.

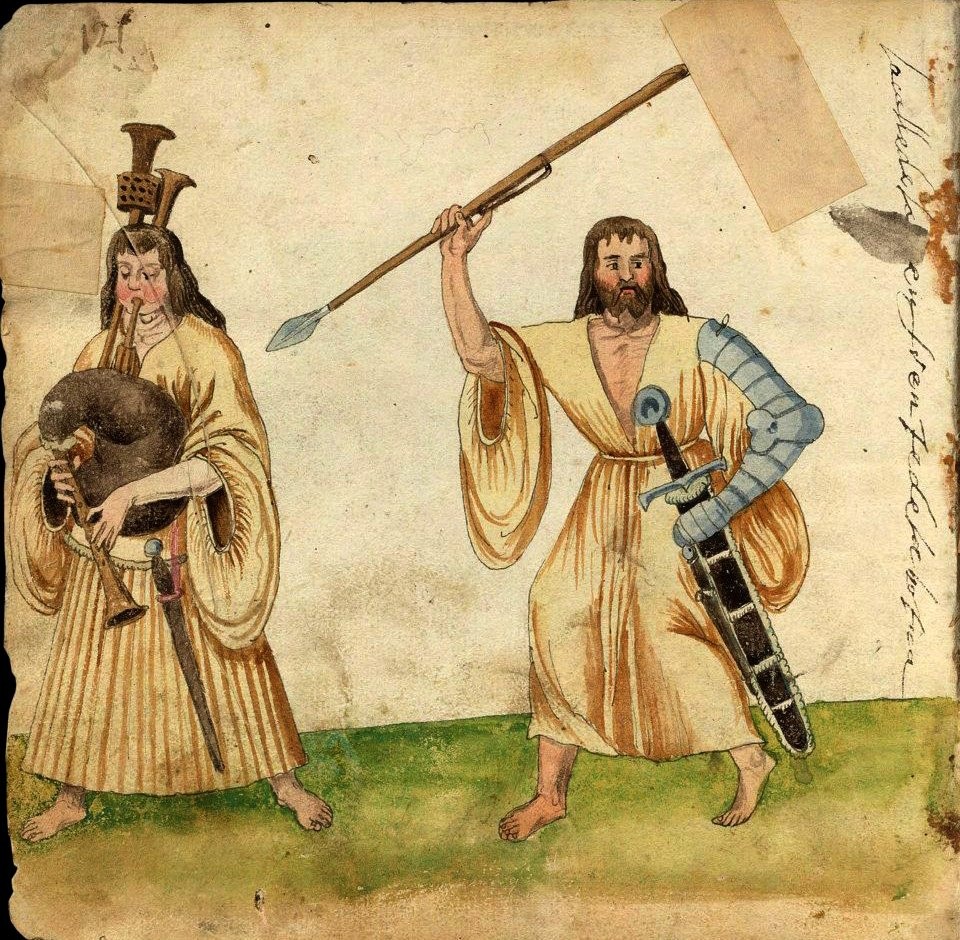
Irish Gaels, c. 1529

An English report of 1515 states that the Irish people were divided into over sixty Gaelic lordships and thirty Anglo-Irish lordships. The English term for these lordships was "nation" or "country". The Irish term "oireacht" referred to both the territory and the people ruled by the lord. Literally, it meant an "assembly", where the Brehons would hold their courts upon hills to arbitrate the matters of the lordship. Indeed, the Tudor lawyer John Davies described the Irish people with respect to their laws:

There is no people under the sun that doth love equal and indifferent (impartial) justice better than the Irish, or will rest better satisfied with the execution thereof, although it be against themselves, as they may have the protection and benefit of the law upon which just cause they do desire it.

Another English commentator records that the assemblies were attended by "all the scum of the country"—the labouring population as well as the landowners. While the distinction between "free" and "unfree" elements of the Irish people was unreal in legal terms, it was a social and economic reality. Social mobility was usually downwards, due to social and economic pressures. The ruling clan's "expansion from the top downwards" was constantly displacing commoners and forcing them into the margins of society.

As a clan-based society, genealogy was all important. Ireland 'was justly styled a "Nation of Annalists"'. The various branches of Irish learning—including law, poetry, history and genealogy, and medicine—were associated with hereditary learned families. The poetic families included the Uí Dhálaigh (Daly) and the MacGrath. Irish physicians, such as the O'Briens in Munster or the MacCailim Mor in the Western Isles, were renowned in the courts of England, Spain, Portugal and the Low Countries. Learning was not exclusive to the hereditary learned families, however; one such example is Cathal Mac Manus, the 15th century diocesan priest who wrote the Annals of Ulster. Other learned families included the Mic Aodhagáin and Clann Fhir Bhisigh. It was this latter family which produced Dubhaltach Mac Fhirbhisigh, the 17th century genealogist and compiler of the Leabhar na nGenealach. (see also Irish medical families).

=== Plantations ===
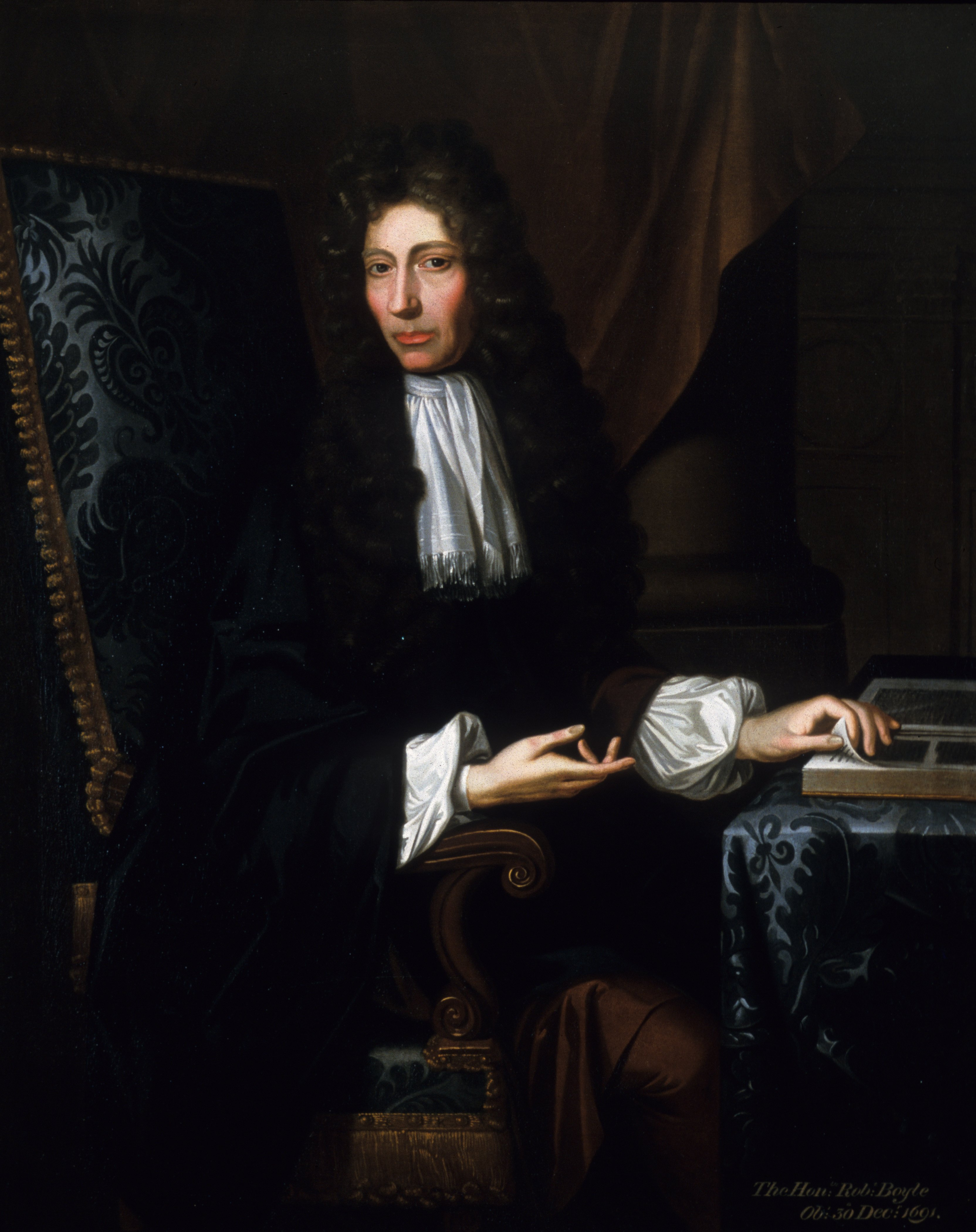
Robert Boyle, an Anglo-Irish scientist and father of chemistry, whose father Richard Boyle, 1st Earl of Cork had settled in Ireland in the Munster plantations in 1580.

The 16th century Age of Discovery brought an interest among the English to colonize Ireland with the reign of the Tudors. King Henry IV established surrender and regrants to the Irish, but it was not until the Catholic queen Mary I of England who started the first plantations in Ireland in 1550, this would become the model for English colonization moving forward in Ireland and would later form the British imperial model The 1550 plantation counties were known as Philipstown (now Daingean) and Maryborough (now Portlaoise) named by the English planters at the time. A group of explorers, known as the West Country Men, were active in Ireland at around this time.

The Enterprise of Ulster which pitted Shane O'Neill (Irish chieftain) against Queen Elizabeth I was a total failure This was followed by the somewhat successful first British-English colony the Munster planations which had a population of 4,000 in 1580 and in the 1620s may have grown to 16,000

After the defeat of the Irish in Ulster in the Nine Years' War (Ireland); which was not exclusively confined to Ulster. The English would try again to colonize Ireland fearing another rebellion in Ulster, using previous colonial Irish endeavours as their influence. King James would succeed Queen Elizabeth the I, because King James I was previously King James VI of Scotland, he would plant both English and Scottish in the plantations of Ulster drawing upon the Munster Plantations, this proved to be the most successful they were settled in what's mostly Now Northern Ireland. The Plantations of Ireland introduced Tudor English settlers to Ireland, while The Plantation of Ulster in the 17th century introduced a great number of Scottish and to a lesser extent English as well as French Huguenots as colonists. All previous endeavours were solely an English venture. The Lord Protector Oliver Cromwell (1653–1658) after the defeat of the Irish rebels would also plant New English in Ireland, known as the Protestant ascendency.

=== Enlightenment Ireland ===
There have been notable Irish scientists. The Anglo-Irish scientist Robert Boyle (1627–1691) is considered the father of chemistry for his book The Sceptical Chymist, written in 1661. Boyle was an atomist, and is best known for Boyle's Law. The hydrographer Rear Admiral Francis Beaufort (1774–1857), an Irish naval officer of Huguenot descent, was the creator of the Beaufort scale for indicating wind force. George Boole (1815–1864), the mathematician who invented Boolean algebra, spent the latter part of his life in Cork. The 19th century physicist George Stoney introduced the idea and the name of the electron. He was the uncle of another notable physicist, George FitzGerald.

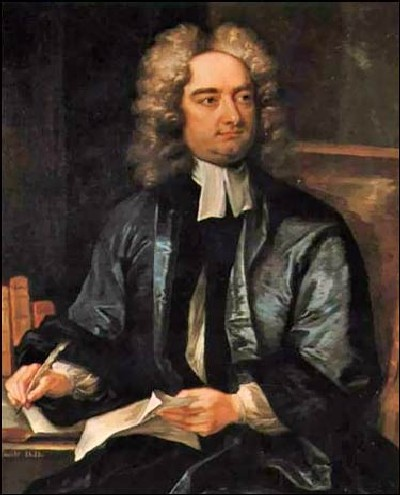
Jonathan Swift, one of the foremost prose satirists in the English language

The Irish bardic system, along with the Gaelic culture and learned classes, were upset by the plantations and went into decline. Among the last of the true bardic poets were Brian Mac Giolla Phádraig (c. 1580–1652) and Dáibhí Ó Bruadair (1625–1698). The Irish poets of the late 17th and 18th centuries moved toward more modern dialects. Among the most prominent of this period were Séamas Dall Mac Cuarta, Peadar Ó Doirnín, Art Mac Cumhaigh, Cathal Buí Mac Giolla Ghunna, and Seán Clárach Mac Domhnaill. Irish Catholics continued to receive an education in secret "hedgeschools", in spite of the Penal laws. A knowledge of Latin was common among the poor Irish mountaineers in the 17th century, who spoke it on special occasions, while cattle were bought and sold in Greek in the mountain market-places of County Kerry.

For a comparatively small population of about 6 million people, Ireland made an enormous contribution to literature. Irish literature encompasses the Irish and English languages. Notable Irish writers, playwrights and poets include Jonathan Swift, Laurence Sterne, Oscar Wilde, Oliver Goldsmith, James Joyce, George Bernard Shaw, Samuel Beckett, Bram Stoker, W.B. Yeats, Séamus Heaney and Brendan Behan.

=== 19th century ===
==== The Great Famine / An Górta Mór ====
Known as An Górta Mór ("The Great Hunger") in the Irish language, during the famine millions of Irish people died and emigrated during Ireland's largest famine. The famine lasted from 1845 – 1849, and it was worst in the year 1847, which became known as Black '47. The famine occurred due to the extremely impoverished Irish population's staple food the potato being infected with Blight, and the British administration appropriating all other crops and livestock to feed her armies abroad. This meant the crop failed and turned black. Starving people who tried to eat them would only vomit it back up soon afterwards. Soup kitchens were set up but made little difference. The British government produced little aid, only sending raw corn known as 'Peel's Brimstone' to Ireland. It was known by this name after the British Prime Minister at the time, Robert Peel, and the fact that many Irish weren't aware of how to cook corn. This led to little or no improvement. The British government set up workhouses which were disease-ridden (with cholera, TB and others) but they also failed as little food was available and many died on arrival as they were overworked. Some British political figures at the time saw the famine as a purge from God to exterminate the majority of the native Irish population. Irish people emigrated to escape the famine journeying predominantly to the east coast of the United States, especially Boston and New York, as well as Liverpool in England, Australia, Canada and New Zealand. Many records show the majority of Irish emigrants to Australia were in fact prisoners. A substantial proportion of these committed crimes in hopes of being extradited to Australia, favouring it to the persecution and hardships they endured in their homeland. Emigrants travelled on 'Coffin Ships', which got their name from the often high mortality rates on board. Many died of disease or starved. Conditions on board were abysmal - tickets were expensive so stowaways were common, and little food stuff was given to passengers who were simply viewed as cargo in the eyes of the ship workers. Notable coffin ships include the Jeanie Johnston and the Dunbrody.

There are statues and memorials in Dublin, New York and other cities in memory of the famine. The Fields of Athenry is a late-20th century song about the Great Famine and is often sung at national team sporting events in memory and homage to those affected by the famine.

The Great Famine is one of the biggest events in Irish history and is ingrained in the identity on the nation to this day. It was a major factor in Irish nationalism and Ireland's fight for independence during subsequent rebellions, as many Irish people felt a stronger need to regain independence from British rule after the famine.

=== 20th century ===
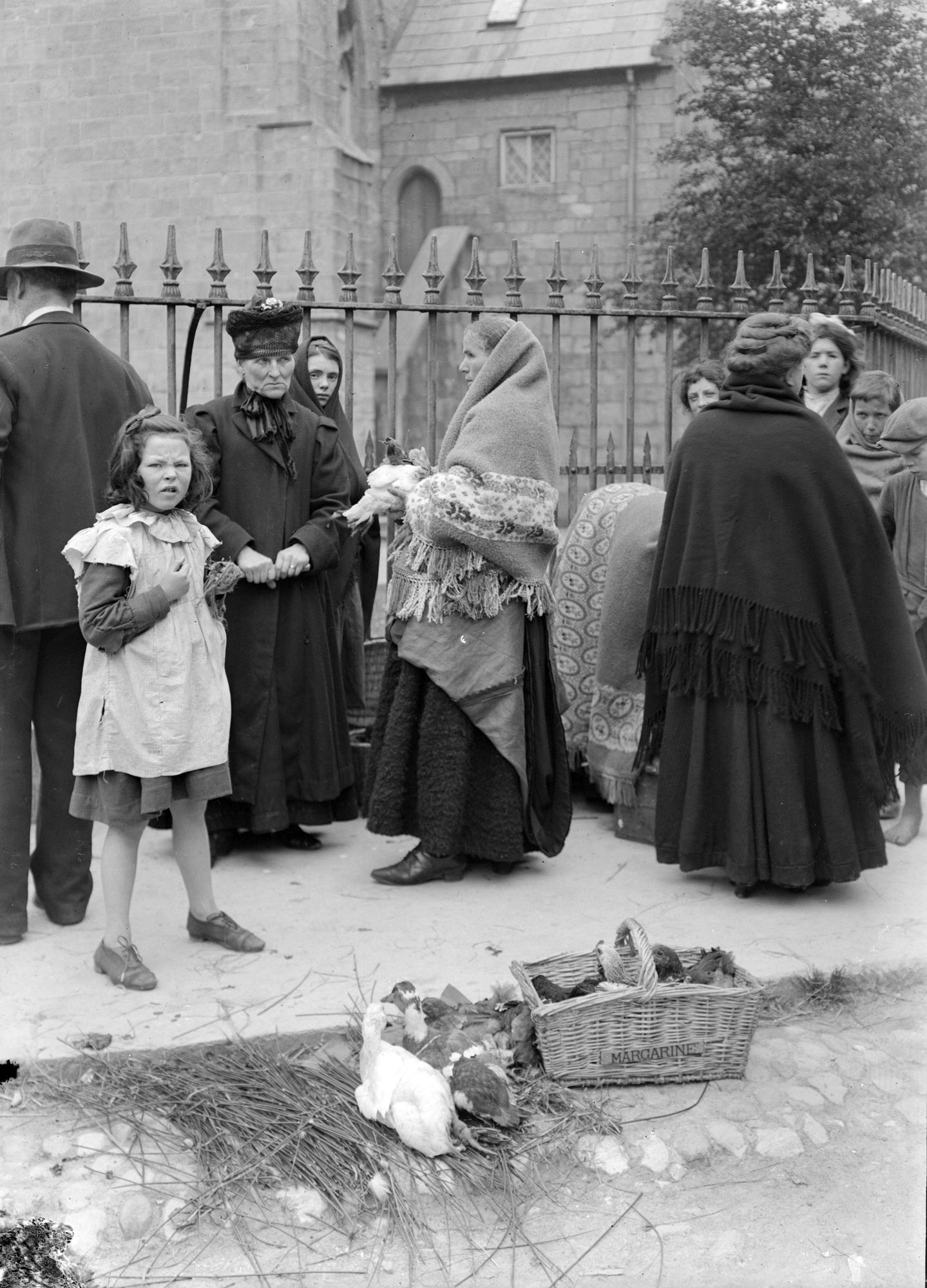
A Market Square in Galway circa 1910

After the Irish War of Independence (1919–1921) the Anglo-Irish Treaty was signed which led to the formation of the independent Irish Free State (now the independent Republic of Ireland) which consisted of 26 of Ireland's 32 traditional counties. The remaining six counties in the northeast remained in the United Kingdom as Northern Ireland. It is predominantly religion, historical, and political differences that divide the two communities of (nationalism and unionism). Four polls taken between 1989 and 1994 revealed that when asked to state their national identity, over 79% of Northern Irish Protestants replied "British" or "Ulster" with 3% or less replying "Irish", while over 60% of Northern Irish Catholics replied "Irish" with 13% or less replying "British" or "Ulster". A survey in 1999 showed that 72% of Northern Irish Protestants considered themselves "British" and 2% "Irish", with 68% of Northern Irish Catholics considering themselves "Irish" and 9% "British". The survey also revealed that 78% of Protestants and 48% of all respondents felt "Strongly British", while 77% of Catholics and 35% of all respondents felt "Strongly Irish". 51% of Protestants and 33% of all respondents felt "Not at all Irish", while 62% of Catholics and 28% of all respondents felt "Not at all British".

== Recent history ==
=== Religion in Ireland ===
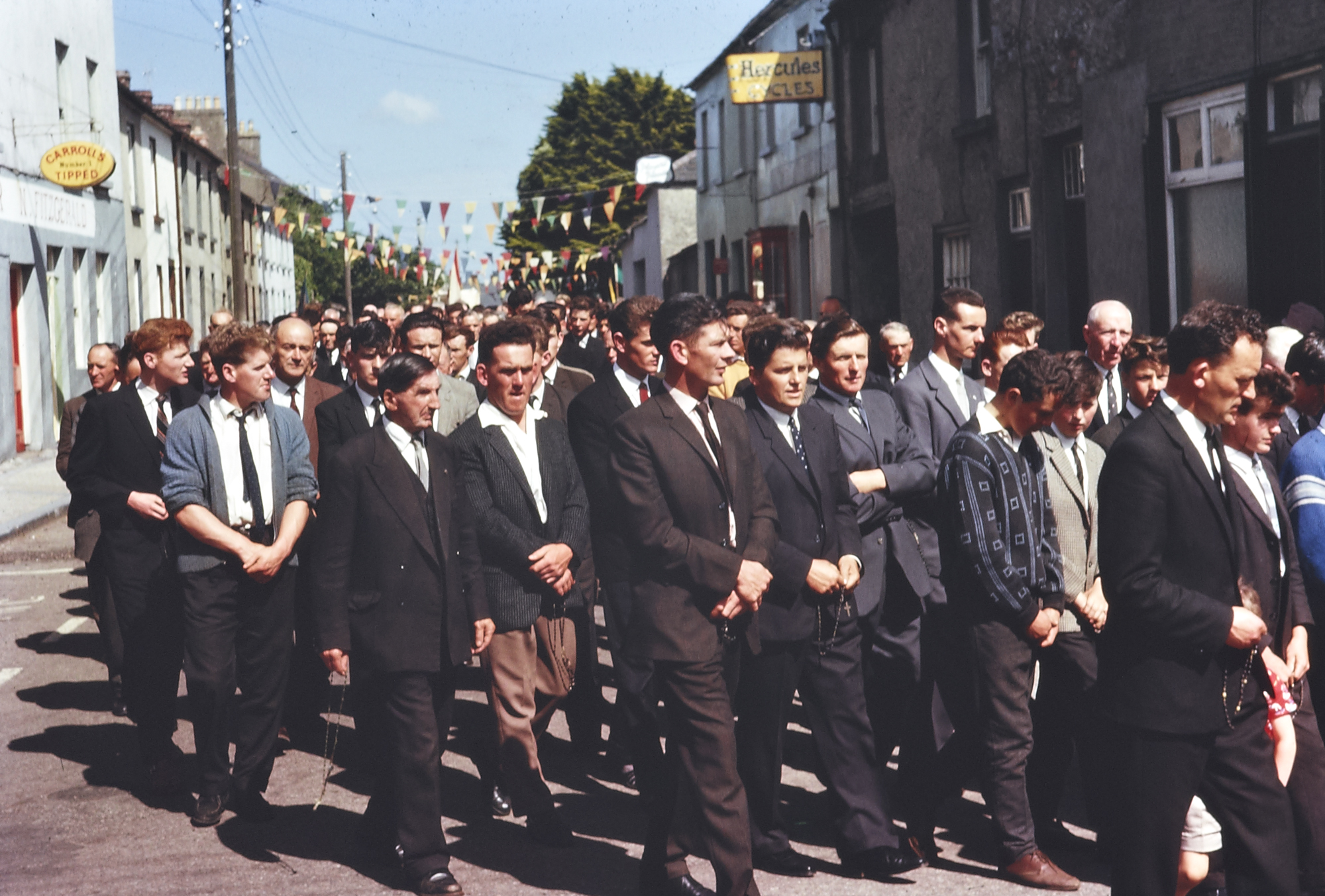
Corpus Christi procession in Tipperary in 1963

In the Republic of Ireland, as of 2022, 3.5 million people or about 69.1% of the population are Catholic. In Northern Ireland, as of 2021, about 42.3% of the population are Catholic while 37.3% are Protestant (16.6% Presbyterian, 11.5% Church of Ireland, 2.4% Methodist, 6.9% other Christian).

The 31st International Eucharistic Congress was held in Dublin in 1932, that year being the supposed 1,500th anniversary of Saint Patrick's arrival. Ireland was then home to 3,171,697 Catholics, about a third of whom attended the Congress. It was noted in Time Magazine that the Congress' special theme would be "the Faith of the Irish". The massive crowds were repeated at Pope John Paul II's Mass in Phoenix Park in 1979. The idea of faith has affected the question of Irish identity even in relatively recent times, apparently more so for Catholics and Irish-Americans. Today the majority of Irish people in the Republic of Ireland identify as Catholic, although church attendance has significantly dropped in recent decades. In Northern Ireland, where almost 50% of the population is Protestant, there has also been a decline in attendances.

What defines an Irishman? His faith, his place of birth? What of the Irish-Americans? Are they Irish? Who is more Irish, a Catholic Irishman such as James Joyce who is trying to escape from his Catholicism and from his Irishness, or a Protestant Irishman like Oscar Wilde who is eventually becoming Catholic? Who is more Irish... someone like C. S. Lewis, an Ulster Protestant, who is walking towards it, even though he never ultimately crosses the threshold?

This has been a matter of concern over the last century for the followers of nationalist ideologists such as D. P. Moran.

=== Irish identity ===
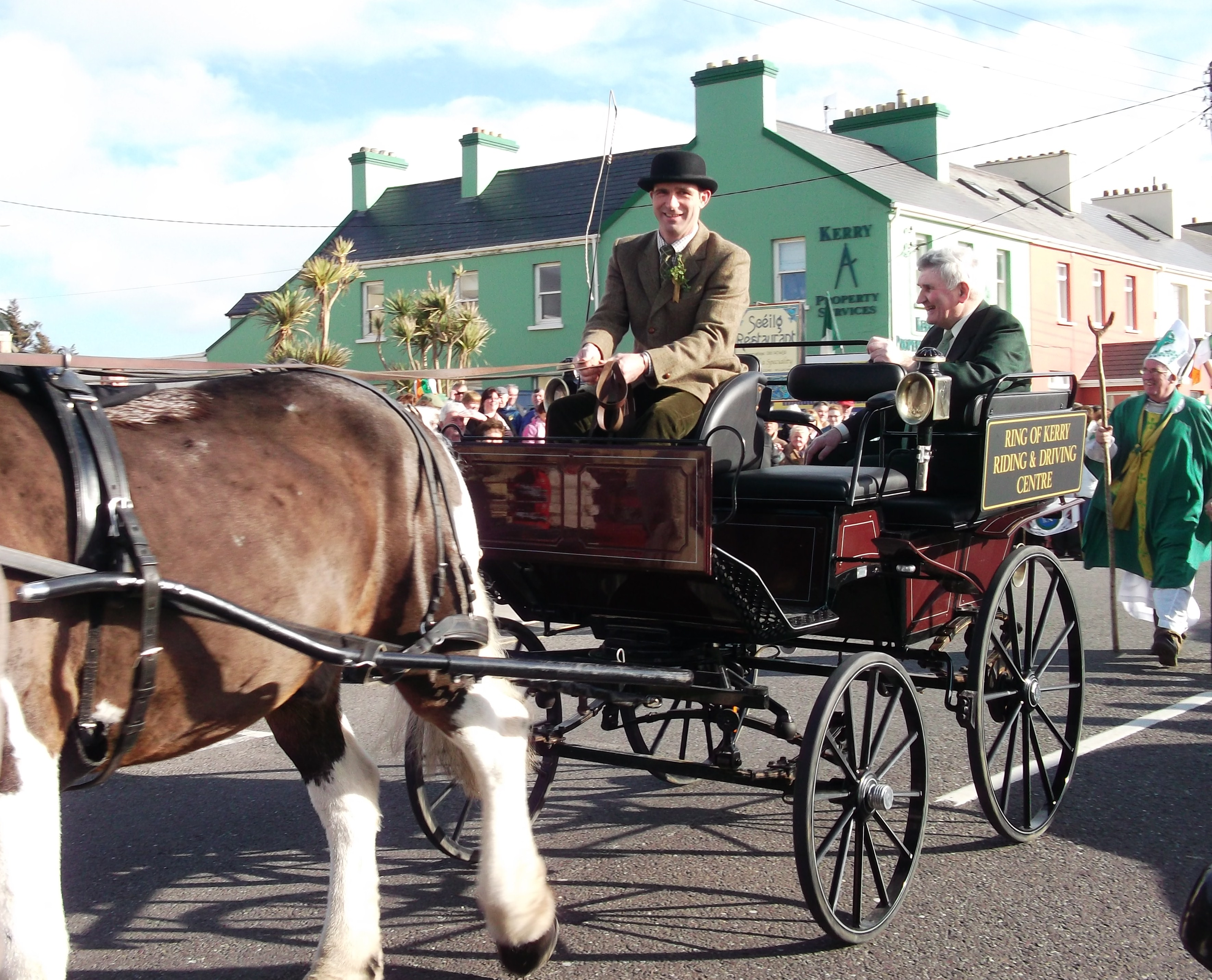
A St Patrick's Day parade in County Kerry

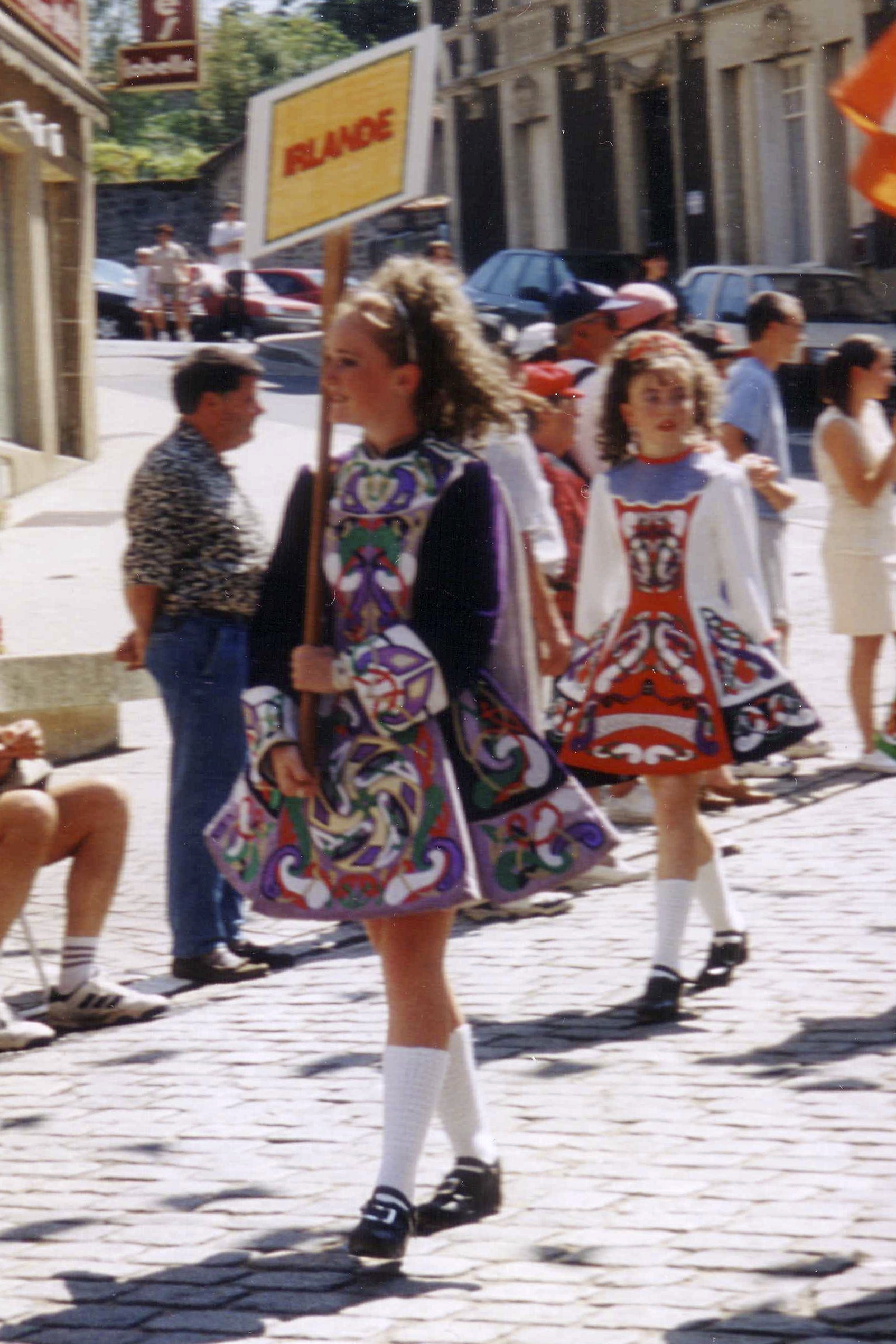
Irish dancers, 1998

Thomas Davis, a prominent Protestant Irish nationalist and founder of the Irish nationalist Young Ireland movement, identified the Irish as a Celtic nation. He estimated that ethnically, 5/6ths of the nation were either of Gaelic Irish-origin, or descended from returned Scottish Gaels (including much of the Ulster Scots) and some Celtic Welsh (such as his own ancestors and those carrying surnames such as Walsh and Griffiths). As part of this he was a staunch supporter of the Irish language as the "national language". In regards to the Germanic minority in Ireland (of Norman and Anglo-Saxon origin) he believed that they could be assimilated into Irishness if they had a "willingness to be part of the Irish Nation".

=== Europe ===
The Republic of Ireland and the United Kingdom joined the European Community in 1973, and Irish citizens became additionally Citizens of the European Union with the Maastricht Treaty signed in 1992. This brought a further question for the future of Irish identity; whether Ireland was "closer to Boston than to Berlin:"

History and geography have placed Ireland in a very special location between America and Europe... As Irish people our relationships with the United States and the European Union are complex. Geographically we are closer to Berlin than Boston. Spiritually we are probably a lot closer to Boston than Berlin. – Mary Harney, Tánaiste, 2000

== Irish diaspora ==
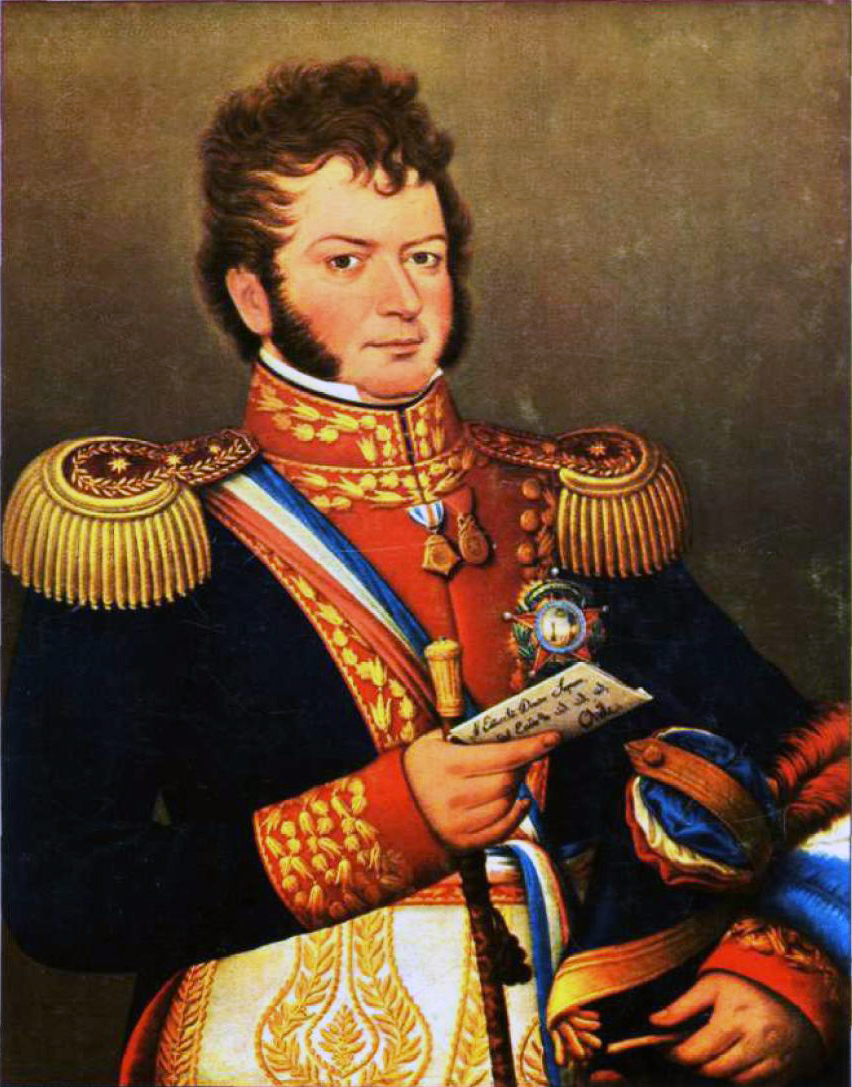
Bernardo O'Higgins, a founding father of Chile.

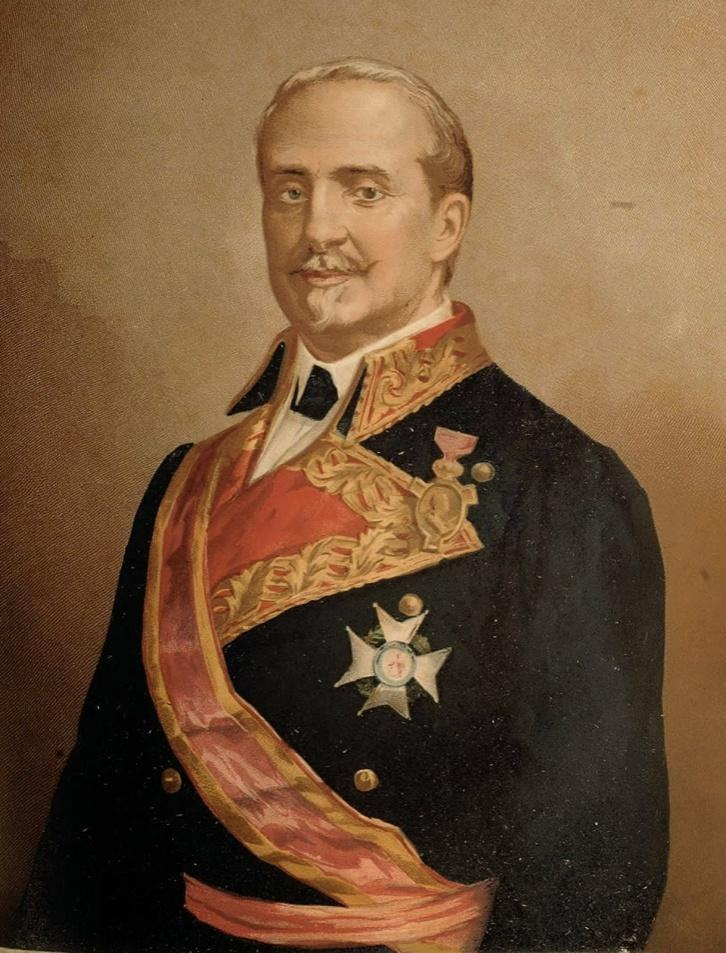
General Leopoldo O'Donnell, 1st Duke of Tetuan, Grandee of Spain and President of the Council of Ministers of Spain

The Irish diaspora consists of Irish emigrants and their descendants in countries such as the United States, Great Britain, Canada, Australia, New Zealand, South Africa, and nations of the Caribbean such as Jamaica and Barbados. These countries all have large minorities of Irish descent, who in addition form the core of the Catholic Church in those countries.

Many Irish people were also transported to the island of Montserrat, to work as indentured servants, exiled prisoners or slaves. Unlike African chattel slaves, the majority of Irish labourers who were sent to Montserrat did so by personal choice. Some were Irish Confederate troops exiled by the English Parliamentarian Oliver Cromwell following the Irish Confederate Wars. The African slave population on the island attempted a rebellion against the Irish plantation owners on 17 March 1768. The date was chosen with the idea that the plantation owners would be distracted by St. Patrick's day festivities, but the plot was ultimately discovered and several of those involved were put to death. To this day, the Island celebrates St. Patrick's Day as a public holiday to commemorate the revolt and honour those who lost their lives. People of Irish descent also feature strongly in Latin America, especially in Argentina and important minorities in Brazil, Chile, and Mexico. In 1995, President Mary Robinson reached out to the "70 million people worldwide who can claim Irish descent". Today the diaspora is believed to contain an estimated 80 million people.

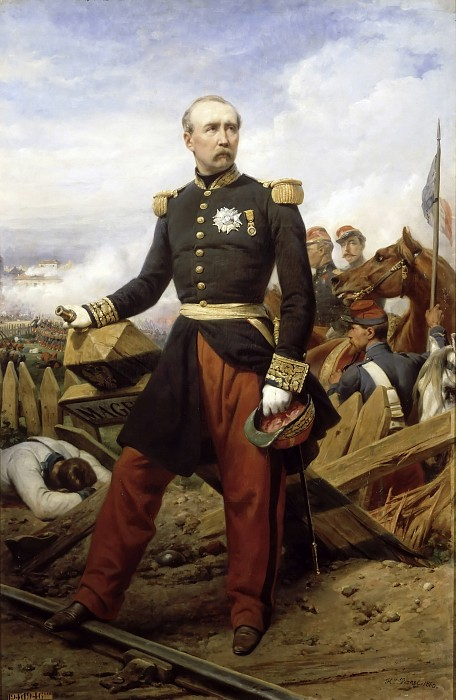
Maréchal The 1st Duke of Magenta, military commander and, later, President of the French Republic

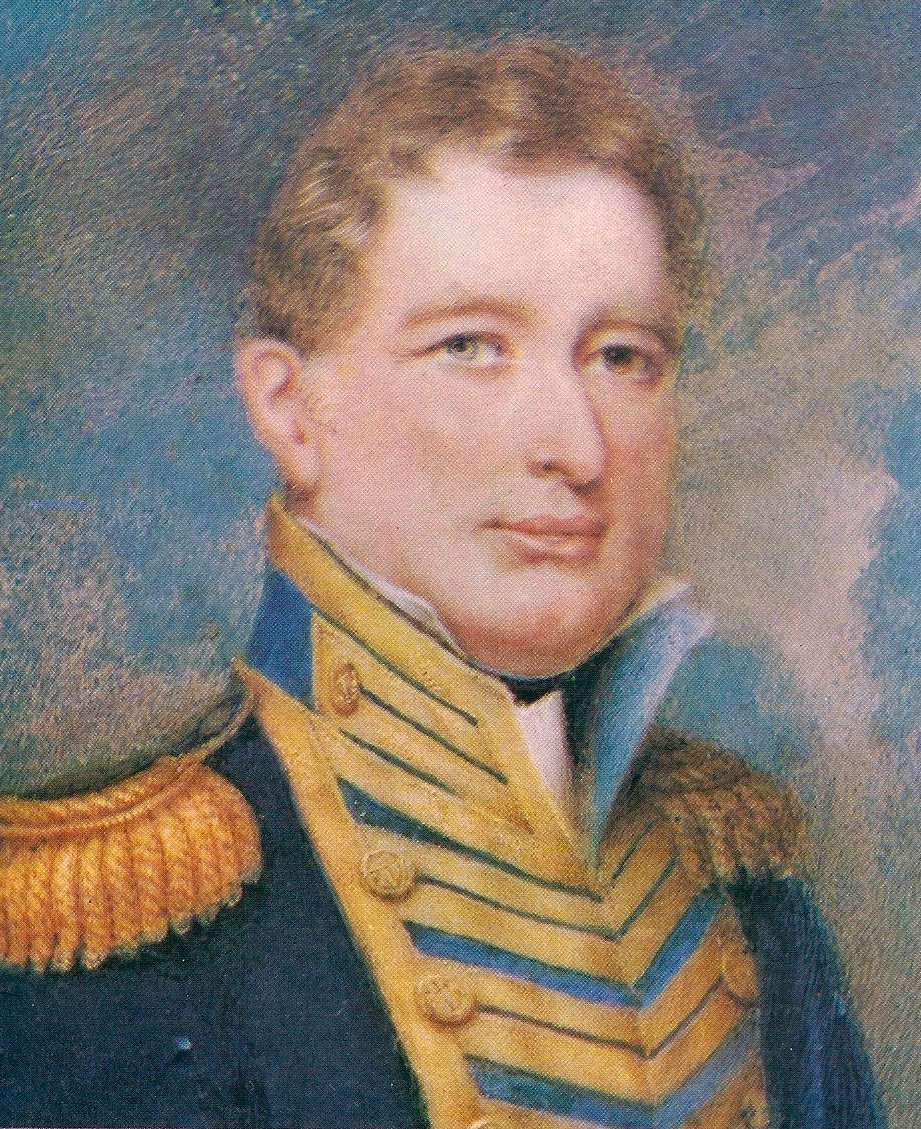
William Brown, Argentine national hero of the War of Independence, considered the father of the Argentine Navy.

There are also large Irish communities in some mainland European countries, notably in Spain, France and Germany. Between 1585 and 1818, over half a million Irish departed Ireland to serve in the wars on the Continent, in a constant emigration romantically styled the"Flight of the Wild Geese" and, before that, in the 'Flight of the Earls', just before the Plantation of Ulster. In the early years of the English Civil War, a French traveller remarked that the Irish "are better soldiers abroad than at home". Later, Irish brigades in France and Spain would fight in the Wars of the Spanish and Austrian Succession and the Napoleonic Wars. In the words of Field Marshal The 1st Duke of Wellington, the Irish-born 'Iron Duke', a notable representative of the Irish military diaspora, "Ireland was an inexhaustible nursery for the finest soldiers".

The British Legions were units that fought under Simón Bolívar against Spain for the independence of Colombia, Venezuela, Ecuador, and Peru. Venezuelans called them the Albion Legion. They were composed of over seven thousand volunteers, mainly Napoleonic War veterans from Great Britain and Ireland. Volunteers in the British Legion were motivated by a combination of both genuine political and mercenary motives. The most famous cause of emigration was the Great Famine of the late 1840s. A million are thought to have emigrated to Liverpool as a result of the famine. For both the Irish in Ireland and those in the resulting diaspora, the famine entered folk memory and became a rallying point for various nationalist movements.

There are Afro-Caribbean people descended from Irish immigrants in the Caribbean, especially on Barbados, Jamaica, and Montserrat. They often have Irish surnames, speak a form of Caribbean English influenced by the Irish vernacular and, in some cases, sing Irish songs.

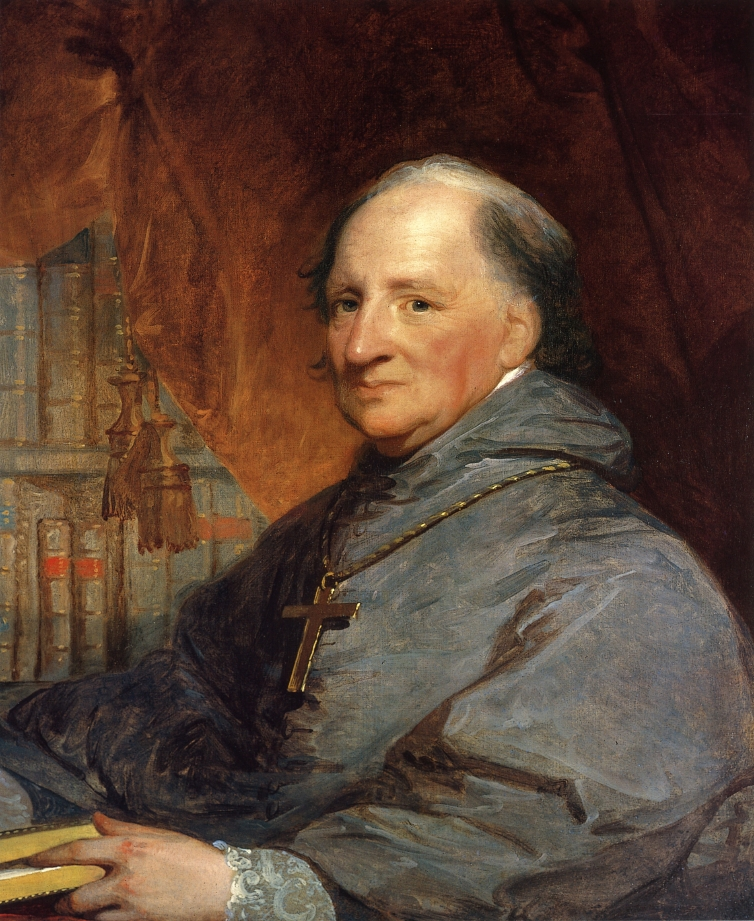
John Carroll, first Catholic bishop and archbishop in the United States

People of Irish descent are the second-largest self-reported ethnic group in the United States, after German Americans. Nine of the signatories of the American Declaration of Independence were of Irish origin. Among them was the sole Catholic signatory, Charles Carroll of Carrollton, whose family were the descendants of Ely O'Carroll, an Irish prince who had suffered under Cromwell. At least twenty-five presidents of the United States have some Irish ancestral origins, including George Washington. Since John F. Kennedy took office in 1961, every American President (with the exception of Gerald Ford and Donald Trump) has had some Irish blood. An Irish-American, James Hoban, was the designer of the White House. Commodore John Barry, who was born in County Wexford, was the "Father of the United States Navy".

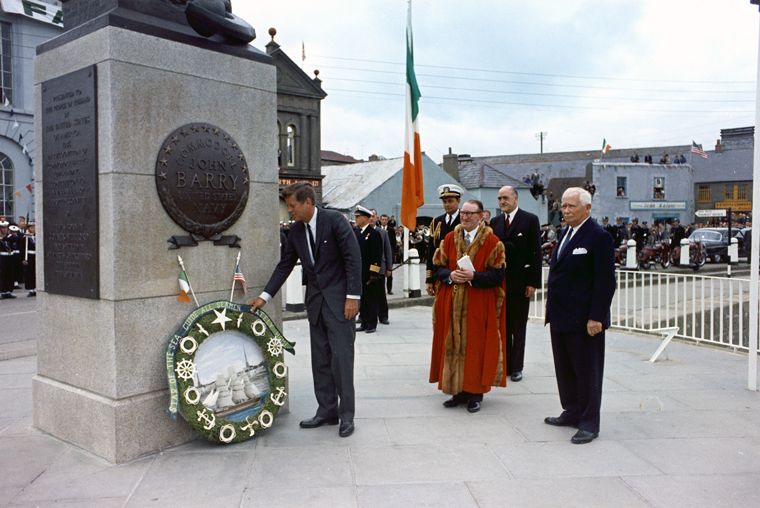
John F. Kennedy visiting the John Barry Memorial in Wexford, Ireland

In the mid-19th century, large numbers of Irish immigrants were conscripted into Irish regiments of the United States Army at the time of the Mexican–American War. The vast majority of the 4,811 Irish-born soldiers served in the U.S. Army, but some deserted to the Mexican Army, primarily to escape mistreatment by Protestant officers and the strong anti-Catholic discrimination in America. These were the San Patricios, or Saint Patrick's Battalion—a group of Irish led by Galway-born John O'Riley, with some German, Scottish and American Catholics. They fought until their surrender at the decisive Battle of Churubusco, and were executed outside Mexico City by the American government on 13 September 1847. The battalion is commemorated in Mexico each year on 12 September.

During the 18th and 19th centuries, 300,000 free emigrants and 45,000 convicts left Ireland to settle in Australia. Today, Australians of Irish descent are one of the largest self-reported ethnic groups in Australia, after English and Australian. In the 2006 Census, 1,803,741 residents identified themselves as having Irish ancestry either alone or in combination with another ancestry. However this figure does not include Australians with an Irish background who chose to nominate themselves as 'Australian' or other ancestries. The Australian embassy in Dublin states that up to thirty per cent of the population claim some degree of Irish ancestry.

It is believed that as many as 30,000 Irish people emigrated to Argentina between the 1830s and the 1890s. This was encouraged by the clergy, as they considered a Catholic country, Argentina, preferable to a more Protestant United States. This flow of emigrants dropped sharply when assisted passage to Australia was introduced at which point the Argentine government responded with their own scheme and wrote to Irish bishops, seeking their support. However, there was little or no planning for the arrival of a large number of immigrants, no housing, no food. Many died, others made their way to the United States and other destinations, some returned to Ireland, a few remained and prospered. Thomas Croke Archbishop of Cashel, said: "I most solemnly conjure my poorer countrymen, as they value their happiness hereafter, never to set foot on the Argentine Republic however tempted to do so they may be by offers of a passage or an assurance of comfortable homes." Some notable Argentines of Irish descent and Irish people who settled in Argentina include Che Guevara, former president Edelmiro Julián Farrell, and admiral William Brown.

There are people of Irish descent all over South America, such as the Chilean liberator Bernardo O'Higgins and the Peruvian photographer Mario Testino. Although some Irish retained their surnames intact, others were assimilated into the Spanish vernacular. The last name O'Brien, for example, became Obregón.

People of Irish descent are also one of the largest self-reported ethnic groups in Canada, after English, French and Scottish Canadians. As of 2006, Irish Canadians number around 4,354,155.

== See also ==
- Anglo Irish
- Ethnic groups in Europe
- Hiberno-Normans
- Irish Travellers
- List of Americans of Irish descent
- List of expatriate Irish populations
- List of Ireland-related topics
- List of Irish people
- Norse–Gaels
- Ogham
- Tanistry
- The Ireland Funds
- Ulster-Scots dialects
- Ulster-Scots people
