= Kearney =

Kearney or Kearneys may refer to:

== Places ==
=== Australia ===
- Kearneys Falls, Queensland
- Kearneys Spring, Queensland

=== Canada ===
- Kearney, Ontario
- Kearney Lake, Nova Scotia

=== Northern Ireland ===
- Kearney, County Down, a townland in County Down

=== United States ===
- Kearney, Missouri
- Kearney, Nebraska
- Kearney, New Jersey
- Kearney, North Carolina
- Kearney County, Nebraska
- Kearney Park, Mississippi
- Kearney Township (disambiguation)

== Companies ==
- Kearney (consulting firm), management consulting firm
- Kearney and Black Hills Railway, a short line railroad between Kearney and Callaway, Nebraska
- Kearney & Company, American accounting firm

== Other uses ==
- Kearney (surname)
- Kearney Air Force Base
- Kearney Research and Extension Center, an agricultural research station in the University of California system
- Kearney Zzyzwicz, a fictional character from The Simpsons
- University of Nebraska at Kearney, known as Kearney State College from 1963 to 1991

== See also ==
- Kearny (disambiguation)
- Kearneysville
- Kerney, a surname
- Carney (disambiguation)
- Carny (disambiguation)
