= Aisling Ní Dhonnchadha =

Lecturer in Modern Irish

Aisling Ní Dhonnchadha is an Irish scholar and academic who previously lectured in the Department of Modern Irish in Maynooth University.

== Selected bibliography ==
- Cnuasach Comhar 1982-2012: Ailt, Aistí, Agallaimh, 2014
- Ar an gCoigríoch: Díolaim Litríochta ar Scéal na hImirce (with Máirín Nic Eoin), Cló Iar-Chonnachta, 2008
- Léachtaí Cholm Cille XXXVI: An Prós Comhaimseartha (editor), An Sagart, 2006
- Idir dhúchas agus dualgas : staidéar ar charachtair mhná sa ghearrscéal Gaelige 1940-1990, An Clóchomhar, 2002
- Gearrscéalta an Chéid, with G. Denvir, Cló Iar-Chonnachta, 2000
