= Kerney =

Kerney is a surname. Notable people with the name include:

- John Kerney (c.1844–1892), Australian criminal
- Kelly Kerney (born 1979), American novelist
- Leopold H. Kerney (1881–1962), Irish diplomat
- Lisa Kerney (born 1981), American sportscaster
- Micheline Kerney Walsh (1919–1997), Irish archivist and historian; daughter of Leopold
- Patrick Kerney (born 1976), American football player

== See also ==
- Kearney (surname)
- Kearney (disambiguation)
