= Kearny =

Kearny may refer to:

== People ==
- Cresson Kearny (1914–2003), American author and researcher
  - Kearny fallout meter
  - Kearny air pump
- Eleanor Kearny Carr (1840–1912), American planter and political hostess, First Lady of North Carolina
- Jillian Kearny, a pseudonym of Ron Goulart
- Lawrence Kearny (1789–1868), American naval officer and diplomat
- Philip Kearny (1815–1862), American major general
- Stephen W. Kearny (1794–1848), American brigadier general, Military Governor of New Mexico and California

== Places ==
- Kearny, Arizona
- Kearny, New Jersey
- Kearny County, Kansas
- Fort Kearny, in Nebraska
- Fort Kearny (Washington, D.C.), an American Civil War fort
- Fort Phil Kearny, a late 1860s fort along the Bozeman Trail in Wyoming
- Kearny Street, in San Francisco, California

== Other ==
- Kearny Airport (disambiguation)
- Kearny High School (disambiguation)
- USS Kearny (DD-432), US Navy destroyer named for Lawrence Kearny

== See also ==
- Kearney (disambiguation)
- Carney (disambiguation)
- Carny (disambiguation)
