= Ó Cearnaigh =

Ó Cearnaigh is an Irish surname. It was Anglicized to Carney and Kearney. Notable people with the surname include:

- Aodán Ó Cearnaigh or Aidan Kearney (hurler), Irish hurler
- Dónall Ó Cearnaigh or Daniel Kearney (born 1989), Irish hurler
- Liam Ó Cearnaig or Liam Kearney, Irish footballer
- Liam Ó Cearnaigh or William Kearney (hurler), Irish hurler
- Máirtín Ó Cearnaigh or Martin Carney, Irish Gaelic footballer
- Mícheál Ó Cearnaigh or Mikey Kearney (born 1995), Irish hurler
- Pádraig Ó Cearnaigh or Pádraig Carney (1928–2019), Irish Gaelic footballer
- Peadar Ó Cearnaigh or Peadar Kearney (1883–1942), Irish songwriter of the national anthem
- Seán Ó Cearnaigh, Irish academic and scholar
- Seánie Ó Cearnaigh or Jackie Carney, Irish Gaelic footballer and trainer
- Seosamh Ó Cearnaigh or Joe Kearney, Irish hurler and Gaelic footballer
