= Governor Carney =

Governor Carney may refer to:

- John Carney (Delaware politician) (born 1956), 74th Governor of Delaware
- Mark Carney (born 1965), Governor of the Bank of Canada, Governor of the Bank of England, Prime Minister of Canada
- Thomas Carney (1824–1888), 2nd Governor of Kansas

== See also ==
- Carney (surname)
- Carney (disambiguation)
