= Rióna Ní Fhrighil =

Irish linguist

Academic background
- Education: M.A., Trinity College Dublin; PhD, Irish, National University of Ireland, Galway

Rióna Ní Fhrighil is an Irish academic and scholar. She lectures in Modern Irish at National University of Ireland, Galway.

== Education ==
Ní Fhrighil earned her Master's degree from Trinity College Dublin and her PhD in Irish from the National University of Ireland, Galway.

== Career ==
She is the co-editor of a peer-reviewed journal titled LÉANN and the principal Irish-language researcher on the project The Representation of Jews in Irish Literature. In 2018, she received a grant to continue researching Human Rights and Modern Irish Poetry.

== Selected bibliography ==
- Briathra, Béithe agus Banfhilí: Filíocht Eavan Boland agus Nuala Ní Dhomhnaill, 2008
- Aistriú Éireann (eds. with Charlie Dillon), 2008
- Ó Theagasc Teanga go Sealbhú Teanga, (eds. with Máirín Nic Eoin), 2009
- Filíocht Chomhaimseartha na Gaeilge, Cois Life, 2010.
- Ó Theagasc Teanga go Sealbhú Teanga: Múineadh agus Foghlaim na Gaeilge ar an Tríú Leibhéal (with Máirín Nic Eoin), Cois Life, 2009
