= O'Banion =

O'Banion is a surname. Notable people with the surname include:

- Dean O'Banion (1892–1924), Irish-American mobster
- John O'Banion (1947–2007), American singer and actor

== See also ==
- O'Banion's, former punk rock club in Chicago
- O'Banion Middle School, in Garland, Texas, United States
