= Joe Kearney =

Irish hurler and Gaelic footballer

Personal information
- Native name: Seosamh Ó Cearnaigh (Irish)
- Born: 22 January 1898 Drinagh, County Cork, Ireland
- Died: 14 June 1952 (aged 54) Ballsbridge, Dublin, Ireland
- Occupation: Medical doctor

Sport
- Football Position: Full-forward
- Hurling Position: Left corner-forward
Clubs
- Years: Club
- St Finbarr's; Collegians
Club titles
	Football	Hurling
Cork titles	3	1
College
- Years: College
- University College Cork
College titles
- Sigerson titles: 2
- Fitzgibbon titles: 2
Inter-county*
Years	County	Apps (scores)
1920-1928 1921-1928	Cork (football); Cork (hurling)	4 (3-1); 8 (2-0)
Inter-county titles
	Football	Hurling
Munster Titles	1	1
All-Ireland Titles	0	1
- *Inter County team apps and scores correct as of 23:57, 6 April 2015.

Joseph Kearney (22 January 1898 – 14 June 1952) was an Irish hurler and Gaelic footballer who played as a forward for the Cork senior teams.

Kearney first arrived on the inter-county scene when he first linked up with the Cork senior football team. He made his senior debut during the 1920 championship. Kearney later became a regular member of the hurling team as well, and won one All-Ireland medal and one Munster medal in hurling, while he also won one Munster medal as a footballer.

At club level Kearney was a three-time championship medallist with Collegians. He also won a championship medal with St Finbarr's.

Throughout his career Kearney made a combined total of 12 championship appearances. He retired from inter-county hurling following the conclusion of the 1928 championships.

== Playing career ==
=== University ===
During his medical studies at University College Cork, Kearney was an automatic inclusion for the Collegians hurling and football teams. In 1922 he was at left corner-forward as UCC faced arch rivals University College Dublin in the inter-varsities hurling decider. Goals proved decisive as Cork powered to a 6-1 to 3-2 victory, with Kearney collecting a first Fitzgibbon Cup medal.

Three years later UCC pulled off a remarkable double with Kearney playing a key role as a dual player. A 7-1 to 2-2 trouncing of University College Dublin secured a second Fitzgibbon Cup medal. Later that year Kearney won a first Sigerson Cup medal as Cork defeated University College Galway by 1-2 to 0-2.

UCC retained their football title in 1926, with Kearney collecting a second Sigerson Cup medal following a 4-3 to 0-2 defeat of University College Dublin.

=== Club ===
Kearney first experienced success in the club championship as a member of the University College Cork senior football team. In 1920 he won his first championship medal as UCC defeated three-in-a-row hopefuls Cobh by 5-4 to 0-1.

In 1926 Kearney was lining out with St Finbarr's, who qualified for the final of the hurling championship. Blackrock were the opponents; however, a narrow 6-2 to 5-4 victory gave him a championship medal in that code.

The following year Kearney had further success with the UCC footballers. A 3-3 to 1-0 defeat of Macroom gave him a second championship medal.

University College Cork retained their title in 1928. A 1-6 to 0-2 defeat of Duhallow United gave Kearney a third and final championship medal.

=== Inter-county ===
Kearney first played for Cork as a member of the senior football team. He made championship debut on 20 June 1920 in a 2-6 to 0-4 Munster semi-final defeat by Kerry.

On 28 May 1922 Kearney made his first championship appearance with the Cork senior hurling team. His side faced a 5-2 to 1-2 defeat by Limerick in what was the delayed Munster final from the previous year.

Kearney was a regular member of the senior hurling team by 1926. He won a Munster medal following a three-game saga with Tipperary, culminating in a 3-6 to 2-4 victory for Cork. On 24 October 1926 he lined out in his first senior All-Ireland decider, as Cork faced Kilkenny for the first time since 1912. At a snow-covered Croke Park, the first half was even enough with Cork holding an interval lead of one point, however, Kilkenny slumped in the second half, going down to a 4-6 to 2-0 defeat. The victory gave Kearney an All-Ireland medal.

Two years later in 1928 Kearney was at full-forward on the Cork football team that faced Tipperary in the provincial decider. A hat-trick of goals from Kearney secured a 4-3 to 0-4 victory and a Munster medal. He had earlier claimed a second Munster hurling medal as a non-playing substitute following a 6-4 to 2-2 defeat of Clare in a replay. On 9 September 1928 Cork faced Galway in the All-Ireland decider. The Westerners, who got a bye into the final without lifting a hurley, were no match as a rout ensued. Cork triumphed by 6-12 to 1-0 with Kearney collecting a second All-Ireland medal as a substitute.

== Honours ==
=== Player ===
University College Cork

- Cork Senior Football Championship (3): 1920, 1927, 1928
- Sigerson Cup (2): 1925, 1926
- Fitzgibbon Cup (2): 1922, 1925

St Finbarr's

- Cork Senior Hurling Championship (1): 1926

Cork

- All-Ireland Senior Hurling Championship (2): 1926, 1928 (sub)
- Munster Senior Hurling Championship (2): 1926, 1928 (sub)
- Munster Senior Football Championship (1): 1928
