= Sweet Grass County, Montana =

County in Montana, United States

- County
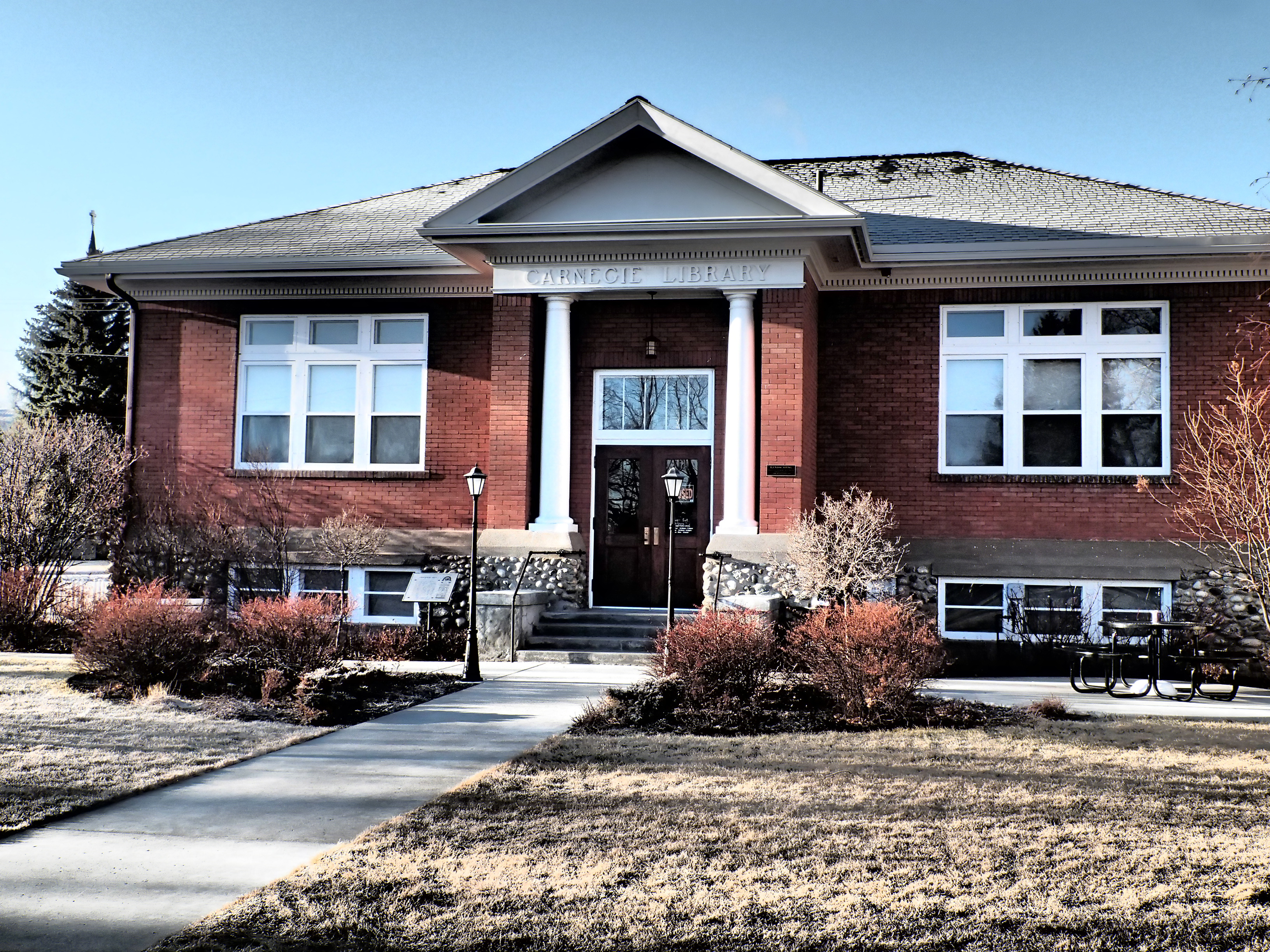
- Carnegie library designed by Link & Haire in Big Timber, Montana

- Location within the U.S. state of Montana
- Coordinates: 45°49′N 109°56′W
- Country: United States
- State: Montana
- Founded: 1895
- Named for: Sweet grass
- Seat: Big Timber
- Largest city: Big Timber

Area
  - Total: 1,862 sq mi (4,820 km^{2})
  - Land: 1,855 sq mi (4,800 km^{2})
  - Water: 6.8 sq mi (18 km^{2}) 0.4%

Population (2020)
  - Total: 3,678
  - Estimate (2025): 3,762 ▲
  - Density: 1.983/sq mi (0.7655/km^{2})
- Time zone: UTC−7 (Mountain)
  - Summer (DST): UTC−6 (MDT)
- Congressional district: 2nd
- Website: sgcountymt.gov
- Montana county number 40

Sweet Grass County is a county located in the U.S. state of Montana. As of the 2020 census, the population was 3,678. Its county seat is Big Timber. The county was founded in 1895.

== History ==
The Montana Legislature authorized Sweet Grass County in 1895, taking parts of Park, Meagher, and Yellowstone counties. That boundary was altered in 1913 when Stillwater County was formed from a portion of Sweet Grass; again in 1917 with the formation of Wheatland County, and in 1920 with the formation of Golden Valley County.

== Climate ==
Sweet Grass County's climate is generally dry and cool, specified as Dfc in the Köppen-Geiger climate classification (subarctic or boreal). Average annual precipitation of 15 inches (380 mm) comes in rain and snow. The summer precipitation accumulation (April through September) averages 10.5 inches (270 mm). The average summer high temperature is 75.3 °F (24.1 °C) and the average minimum temperature during that period is 44.2 °F (6.8 °C). July and August are the hottest months. The annual average high temperature is 60.6 °F (15.9 °C) and the annual average minimum temperature is 33.6 °F (0.9 °C). The coldest temperature recorded in the county in recent times was −47 °F (−44 °C) in February 1936, and the warmest was 107 °F (42 °C) in July 2002. Big Timber receives 286 sunny days on average.

== Geography ==
According to the United States Census Bureau, the county has a total area of 1,862 square miles (4,820 km^{2}), of which 1,855 square miles (4,800 km^{2}) is land and 6.8 square miles (18 km^{2}) (0.4%) is water.

=== Major highways ===
- Interstate 90
- U.S. Highway 191
- U.S. Highway 10 (Former)

=== Transit ===
- Jefferson Lines

=== Adjacent counties ===
- Wheatland County - north
- Golden Valley County - northeast
- Stillwater County - east
- Park County - west
- Meagher County - northwest

=== National protected areas ===
- Custer National Forest (part)
- Gallatin National Forest (part)
- Lewis and Clark National Forest (part)

== Demographics ==
Historical population
| Census | Pop. | Note | %± |
|---|---|---|---|
| 1900 | 3,086 | | — |
| 1910 | 4,029 | | 30.6% |
| 1920 | 4,926 | | 22.3% |
| 1930 | 3,944 | | −19.9% |
| 1940 | 3,719 | | −5.7% |
| 1950 | 3,621 | | −2.6% |
| 1960 | 3,290 | | −9.1% |
| 1970 | 2,980 | | −9.4% |
| 1980 | 3,216 | | 7.9% |
| 1990 | 3,154 | | −1.9% |
| 2000 | 3,609 | | 14.4% |
| 2010 | 3,651 | | 1.2% |
| 2020 | 3,678 | | 0.7% |
| 2025 (est.) | 3,762 | ▲ | 2.3% |
U.S. Decennial Census; 1790–1960, 1900–1990, 1990–2000, 2010–2020

=== 2020 census ===
As of the 2020 census, the county had a population of 3,678. Of the residents, 20.5% were under the age of 18 and 27.0% were 65 years of age or older; the median age was 48.4 years. For every 100 females there were 103.2 males, and for every 100 females age 18 and over there were 101.2 males. 0.0% of residents lived in urban areas and 100.0% lived in rural areas.

The racial makeup of the county was 91.8% White, 0.2% Black or African American, 0.7% American Indian and Alaska Native, 0.4% Asian, 0.6% from some other race, and 6.2% from two or more races. Hispanic or Latino residents of any race comprised 2.7% of the population.

There were 1,594 households in the county, of which 25.7% had children under the age of 18 living with them and 20.3% had a female householder with no spouse or partner present. About 30.4% of all households were made up of individuals and 16.5% had someone living alone who was 65 years of age or older.

There were 1,949 housing units, of which 18.2% were vacant. Among occupied housing units, 74.0% were owner-occupied and 26.0% were renter-occupied. The homeowner vacancy rate was 1.8% and the rental vacancy rate was 6.2%.

=== 2010 census ===
As of the 2010 census, there were 3,651 people, 1,590 households, and 1,045 families in the county. The population density was 2.0 people per square mile (0.77 people/km^{2}). There were 2,148 housing units at an average density of 1.2 units per square mile (0.46/km^{2}). The racial makeup of the county was 96.6% white, 0.7% Asian, 0.4% American Indian, 0.1% black or African American, 0.6% from other races, and 1.5% from two or more races. Those of Hispanic or Latino origin made up 1.4% of the population. In terms of ancestry, 25.3% were German, 22.6% were Norwegian, 13.0% were American, 12.8% were Irish, 10.8% were English, and 7.3% were Scottish.

Of the 1,590 households, 28.3% had children under the age of 18 living with them, 56.2% were married couples living together, 6.5% had a female householder with no husband present, 34.3% were non-families, and 30.4% of all households were made up of individuals. The average household size was 2.27 and the average family size was 2.82. The median age was 46.6 years.

The median income for a household in the county was $43,723 and the median income for a family was $56,552. Males had a median income of $35,385 versus $25,000 for females. The per capita income for the county was $22,785. About 10% of the families and 12.1% of the population were below the poverty line, including 17.8% of those under age 18 and 9.9% of those age 65 or over.

== Politics ==
In presidential elections, Sweet Grass County is among the most consistently Republican counties in the state and the nation. The last, and one of the only, times the Democratic candidate carried the county was in 1936 when Franklin D. Roosevelt won every county in Montana. In both the 1916 and 1932 Presidential elections, Sweet Grass County was the only county in Montana to be won by the Republican.

The county is also Republican at a local level. In 2025 Governor Greg Gianforte won with 75% of the vote. Previous Democratic governor Brian Schweitzer never won a majority of the county's vote and no Democratic gubernatorial candidate has carried the county in decades. In 2025, the Montana Senate is represented by Republican Wylie Galt and the Montana House of Representatives is represented by Republican Randyn Gregg.

United States presidential election results for Sweet Grass County, Montana
| Year | Republican | | Democratic | | Third party(ies) | |
| Year | No. | % | No. | % | No. | % |
|---|---|---|---|---|---|---|
| 1904 | 538 | 70.51% | 174 | 22.80% | 51 | 6.68% |
| 1908 | 526 | 63.76% | 264 | 32.00% | 35 | 4.24% |
| 1912 | 181 | 19.21% | 277 | 29.41% | 484 | 51.38% |
| 1916 | 890 | 50.20% | 839 | 47.32% | 44 | 2.48% |
| 1920 | 1,035 | 73.51% | 349 | 24.79% | 24 | 1.70% |
| 1924 | 853 | 59.57% | 248 | 17.32% | 331 | 23.11% |
| 1928 | 1,163 | 72.46% | 435 | 27.10% | 7 | 0.44% |
| 1932 | 784 | 49.18% | 761 | 47.74% | 49 | 3.07% |
| 1936 | 664 | 43.01% | 783 | 50.71% | 97 | 6.28% |
| 1940 | 861 | 53.45% | 741 | 46.00% | 9 | 0.56% |
| 1944 | 897 | 62.29% | 533 | 37.01% | 10 | 0.69% |
| 1948 | 843 | 61.71% | 499 | 36.53% | 24 | 1.76% |
| 1952 | 1,315 | 77.17% | 372 | 21.83% | 17 | 1.00% |
| 1956 | 1,129 | 71.28% | 455 | 28.72% | 0 | 0.00% |
| 1960 | 1,096 | 67.78% | 521 | 32.22% | 0 | 0.00% |
| 1964 | 856 | 56.54% | 653 | 43.13% | 5 | 0.33% |
| 1968 | 1,043 | 70.00% | 336 | 22.55% | 111 | 7.45% |
| 1972 | 1,260 | 76.00% | 350 | 21.11% | 48 | 2.90% |
| 1976 | 1,135 | 68.41% | 502 | 30.26% | 22 | 1.33% |
| 1980 | 1,169 | 67.22% | 440 | 25.30% | 130 | 7.48% |
| 1984 | 1,417 | 78.59% | 378 | 20.97% | 8 | 0.44% |
| 1988 | 1,242 | 71.67% | 462 | 26.66% | 29 | 1.67% |
| 1992 | 880 | 48.86% | 395 | 21.93% | 526 | 29.21% |
| 1996 | 1,109 | 62.23% | 469 | 26.32% | 204 | 11.45% |
| 2000 | 1,450 | 78.55% | 305 | 16.52% | 91 | 4.93% |
| 2004 | 1,509 | 76.10% | 445 | 22.44% | 29 | 1.46% |
| 2008 | 1,494 | 71.72% | 541 | 25.97% | 48 | 2.30% |
| 2012 | 1,594 | 75.30% | 475 | 22.44% | 48 | 2.27% |
| 2016 | 1,595 | 75.70% | 402 | 19.08% | 110 | 5.22% |
| 2020 | 1,840 | 75.22% | 549 | 22.44% | 57 | 2.33% |
| 2024 | 1,789 | 75.14% | 525 | 22.05% | 67 | 2.81% |

== Culture ==
The county was the setting of the 2009 sheep-herding documentary Sweetgrass. The film takes place in many counties in Montana but the title comes from this county.

== Communities ==
=== City ===
- Big Timber (county seat)

=== Census-designated place ===
- Greycliff

=== Unincorporated communities ===
- Carney
- McLeod
- Meyers Creek
- Melville
- Quebec
- Sourdough

== See also ==
- List of lakes in Sweet Grass County, Montana
- List of mountains in Sweet Grass County, Montana
- National Register of Historic Places listings in Sweet Grass County, Montana
