= Justice Carney =

Justice Carney may refer to:

- Paul Carney (1943–2015), justice of the High Court of Ireland
- Susan M. Carney (born 1962), justice of the Supreme Court of Alaska

== See also ==
- Carney (surname)
- Judge Carney (disambiguation)
- Carney (disambiguation)
