= Sourdough, Montana =

- Unincorporated community
- Location within Montana Location within the United States
- Coordinates: 45°54′07″N 109°48′52″W
- Country: United States
- State: Montana
- County: Sweet Grass
- Elevation: 4,662 ft (1,421 m)
- Time zone: UTC-7 (Mountain (MST))
  - Summer (DST): UTC-6 (MDT)
- Area code: 406
- GNIS feature ID: 776749

Sourdough is an unincorporated community and ghost town in Sweet Grass County, Montana, United States. Sourdough is northeast of Big Timber.

Sourdough appears on the Ryan Creek U.S. Geological Survey Map.

== History ==
Established in 1912, Sourdough was an isolated village situated in the Crazy Mountains. It had homes and a schoolhouse. The schoolhouse has been restored and relocated to Big Timber and part of the Crazy Mountain Museum.

There is nothing left in the location of Sourdough today.
