= Kearney Township =

Kearney Township may refer to:

- Kearney Township, Michigan
- Kearney Township, Clay County, Missouri
