= Carny (disambiguation) =

A carny is a carnival employee.

Carny, Carnie, or Carnies may also refer to:

== Entertainment ==
- Carnies (film), a 2010 horror film
- Carny (1980 film), a film starring Jodie Foster
- Carny (2009 film), a television film starring Lou Diamond Phillips
- Carny (band), a psychedelic blues band from Austin, Texas
- "The Carny", a 1986 song by Nick Cave and the Bad Seeds
- "Carnies", the fifth track on Canadian rock trio Rush's 2012 album, Clockwork Angels

== People ==
=== Given name ===
- Carnie Smith (born 1911–1979), American football player and coach
- Carnie Wilson (born 1968), American singer and television host
- Ethel Carnie Holdsworth (1886–1962), British author

=== Surname ===
- Andrew Carnie (born 1969), associate professor of linguistics at the University of Arizona
- Dave Carnie (born 1969), former editor-in-chief of Big Brother Magazine
- John Carnie (born 1927–2009), Australian politician

== See also ==
- Carney (disambiguation)
- Carni
- Carry (disambiguation)
- Kearney (disambiguation)
- Kearny (disambiguation)
- Carnival (disambiguation)
