= Judge Carney =

Judge Carney may refer to:

- Cormac J. Carney (born 1959), judge of the United States District Court for the Central District of California
- Susan L. Carney (born 1951), judge of the United States Court of Appeals for the Second Circuit.

== See also ==
- Carney (surname)
- Justice Carney (disambiguation)
- Carney (disambiguation)
