= Senator Carney =

Senator Carney may refer to:

- Charles J. Carney (1913–1987), Ohio State Senate
- Francis Patrick Carney (1846–1902), Colorado State Senate

== See also ==
- Carney (surname)
- Carney (disambiguation)
