= Quebec, Montana =

- Unincorporated community
- Location within Montana Location within the United States
- Coordinates: 45°43′36″N 109°39′34″W
- Country: United States
- State: Montana
- County: Sweet Grass
- Elevation: 3,819 ft (1,164 m)
- Time zone: UTC-7 (Mountain (MST))
  - Summer (DST): UTC-6 (MDT)
- Area code: 406
- GNIS feature ID: 775511

Quebec is an unincorporated community in Sweet Grass County, Montana, United States. Quebec is located along Interstate 90, southeast of Big Timber.

== History ==
The town of Quebec was used for fur trading in the French Louisiana Territory. The town maintained friendly relations with the local indigenous peoples of Montana. Following the Louisiana Purchase, the town of Quebec, with the rest of Montana, became a part of the United States. While the town no longer exists, the name has been maintained in the area.
