= Máirín Ní Ghadhra =

Irish broadcaster and writer

Máirín Ní Ghadhra (born 1971) is an Irish broadcaster and writer.

A graduate of National University of Ireland, Galway, Ní Ghadhra has worked with RTÉ Raidió na Gaeltachta since the 1980s, firstly as a continuity announcer and latterly in the news department. She presents Nuacht a hAon on RTÉ Raidió na Gaeltachta. Her children's books are published by Cló Iar-Chonnacht.

She is a mother to two children and now lives in Carraroe, County Galway.

She was born in Furbo, in Connemara on 30 May 1971.

== Bibliography ==
- Taibhse an Dá Thaobh
- Lámh Mharbh Abú!
- An Cúigear Cróga (The Famous Five): A Lazy Afternoon
- Horrid Henry Dónall Dána The Full Set, with Gormfhlaith Ní Thuairisg and Marion Ní Shúilleabháin
