= Kearny High School =

There is more than one school named Kearny High School:

- Kearny High School (California)
- Kearny High School (New Jersey)

== See also ==
- Kearney High School (Kearney, Nebraska)
