= Kelly Kerney =

American novelist

- Born: 1979 (age 46–47)
- Education: Bowdoin College; University of Notre Dame (MFA)
- Occupation: Novelist

Kelly Kerney (born 1979) is an American novelist. Her first novel, Born Again, was published in 2006, and her second novel, Hard Red Spring, was published in 2016.

== Career ==
After having been raised in a Pentecostal Church, Kerney graduated from Bowdoin College in 2002 and later received her MFA from the University of Notre Dame.

Her first novel Born Again follows an evangelical Christian who comes to terms with evolution. The novel received several positive reviews, including ones from Entertainment Weekly, the San Francisco Chronicle, The New York Times, and Pulitzer Prize-winner Richard Russo.

== Novels ==
- Born Again (2006)
- Hard Red Spring (2016)
