= Kearney Township, Clay County, Missouri =

Township in Clay County, Missouri, U.S.

Kearney Township
- Township
- Interactive map of Kearney Township
- Coordinates: 39°23′27″N 94°23′24″W
- Country: United States
- State: Missouri
- County: Clay

Area
  - Total: 64.27 sq mi (166.5 km^{2})
  - Land: 63.92 sq mi (165.6 km^{2})
  - Water: 0.35 sq mi (0.91 km^{2}) 0.54%
- Elevation: 837 ft (255 m)

Population (2020)
  - Total: 15,626
  - Density: 244.5/sq mi (94.4/km^{2})
- FIPS code: 29-04738090
- GNIS feature ID: 766507

Kearney Township is a township in Clay County, Missouri, United States. At the 2020 census, its population was 15,626.

Kearney Township was erected in 1872, taking its name from Kearney, Missouri.
