= Carney, Montana =

- Unincorporated community
- Location within Montana Location within the United States
- Coordinates: 45°45′55″N 110°07′26″W
- Country: United States
- State: Montana
- County: Sweet Grass
- Elevation: 4,154 ft (1,266 m)
- Time zone: UTC-7 (Mountain (MST))
  - Summer (DST): UTC-6 (MDT)
- Area code: 406
- GNIS feature ID: 806913

Carney is an unincorporated community in Sweet Grass County, Montana, United States. Carney is located along Interstate 90, southwest of Big Timber.

== History ==
Carney was a stop on the Northern Pacific railway situated on Interstate 90 about eight miles southwest of Big Timber. It once had a depot and an elevator that supported nearby ranches and a small community. The ranches are still present but the town is no longer.
