= O'Banion's =

Nightclub in Chicago, Illinois, United States

O'Banion's Bar
- Interactive map of O'Banion's Bar
- Address: 661 N. Clark St.
- Location: Chicago, Illinois
- Coordinates: 41°53′39.1″N 87°37′51.6″W
- Type: Nightclub

Construction
- Opened: 1978
- Closed: 1982

O'Banion's was a nightclub located at 661 N. Clark St. in Chicago's River North neighborhood. Named for Chicago Irish gangster Dion O'Banion, it was established in June 1978, inside what had formerly been McGovern’s Saloon (itself an infamous Chicago gangster bar where a young O'Banion had performed as a singing waiter) as well as a series of strip clubs and gay bars. Chicago's first Punk club Le Mer Viper had burned down two months prior, and O'Banion's began to form the epicenter of the city's early punk scene in what was then a notorious skid row area as well as hire many of the former employees of Le Mer Viper.

The club promoted shows by national-touring acts including Toxic Reasons, Hüsker Dü, The Replacements, and Dead Kennedys. Additionally, numerous bands from Chicago's own music scene began playing shows there before achieving wider success, including Naked Raygun, Strike Under, Ministry, and Skafish.

In 1979, the club began hosting newly popular new wave bands after a series of difficulties with their earlier clientele, but owner Rus Cramsie closed the venue in 1982 after encountering financial difficulties.

The building was eventually renovated into The Kerryman bar and restaurant as River North began to gentrify in the 1990s.
