= Kearny Airport =

Kearny Airport may refer to:

- Kearny Airport (Arizona), an airport located near Kearny, Pinal County, Arizona, United States
- Kearney Regional Airport, an airport near Kearney, Buffalo County, Nebraska, United States
