= Debra Carney =

American mathematician

Debra Susan Carney is an American mathematics educator, and University Distinguished Teaching Professor of mathematics, at the Colorado School of Mines. Her work focuses on educating future secondary-school mathematics teachers.

== Education and career ==
Carney majored in mathematics at the University of Vermont, graduating in 1991. She completed a Ph.D. in mathematical logic in 1998 at the University of Maryland, College Park. Her dissertation, Linear Structures with Few Substructures, was supervised by Michael C. Laskowski.

After both completing doctorates in mathematics at the University of Maryland, she and her husband Nic Ormes became faculty members at the University of Denver, where her husband still teaches. In 2012, after nine years at the university, Carney moved to her present position at the Colorado School of Mines. She was named University Distinguished Teaching Professor for 2023–2024.

== Recognition ==
In 2022, Carney was named a Fellow of the Association for Women in Mathematics, "for her extraordinary support of women in the mathematical sciences through personal mentorship and leadership of her local AWM chapter; and for community outreach activities that have had lasting and positive impacts on the lives of women and girls ranging from high school students to faculty members".
