= Kearney and Black Hills Railway =

The Kearney and Black Hills Railway was a short line railroad built in the late 19th century between Kearney and Callaway, Nebraska. It was purchased by the Union Pacific Railroad in 1898.
