= Thomas M. Carney =

American politician

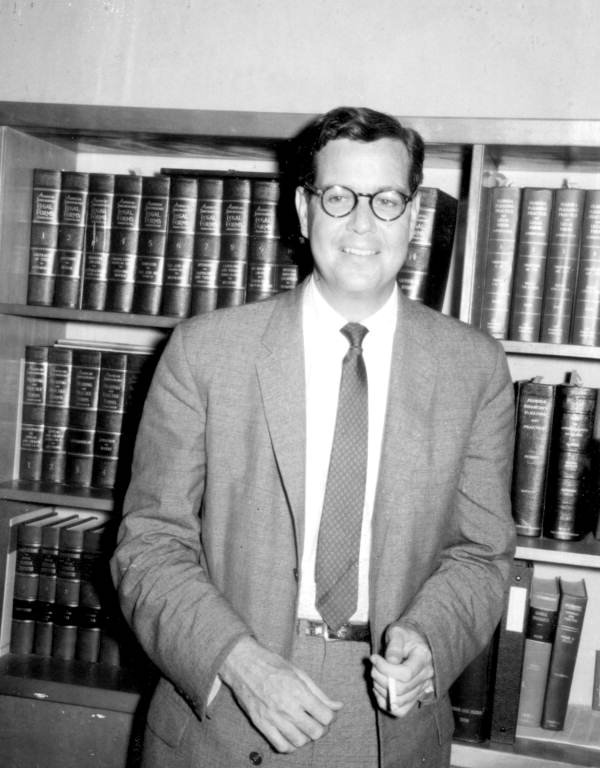
- Carney in 1959

Member of the Florida House of Representatives from Pinellas County
- In office 1957–1959

Personal details
- Born: April 19, 1929 White Plains, New York, U.S.
- Died: September 12, 1964 (aged 35)
- Party: Republican
- Education: University of Florida

Thomas M. Carney (April 19, 1929 – September 12, 1964) was an American politician. He served as a Republican member of the Florida House of Representatives.

== Life and career ==
Carney was born in White Plains, New York. He attended the University of Florida.

Carney served in the Florida House of Representatives from 1957 to 1959.

Carney died on September 12, 1964, at the age of 35.
