= Carney, County Tipperary =

Village in County Tipperary, Ireland

Coordinates: 52.951°N 8.1926°W

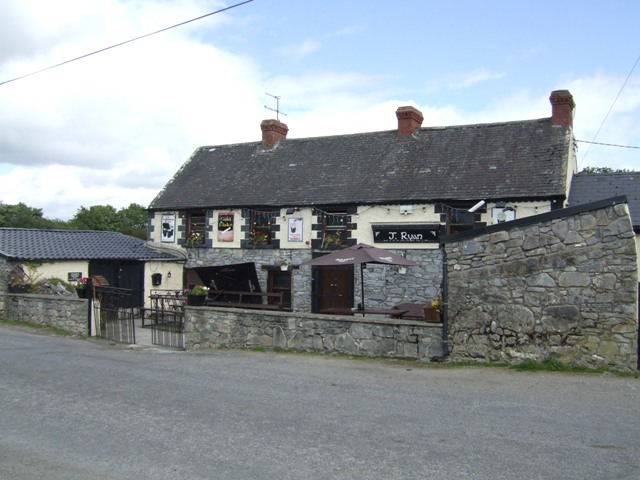
John Ryan's Bar in Carneybeg townland, was built c.1870

Carney (Irish: Carnaigh) is a small village in North County Tipperary in Ireland. It is located in the civil parish of Cloghprior alongside the townlands of Carneybeg, Carneycastle, Carneycastle, Carneywoodlands, and Carney Commons. It is approximately 5 km from Puckane and 8 km from Borrisokane town.

Shane MacGowan, lead singer in The Pogues, had family connections to the nearby townland of Carney Commons.
