= Máirín Nic Eoin =

Irish academic and scholar

Máirín Nic Eoin is an Irish academic and scholar.

Nic Eoin is Professor Emerita of Irish at St Patrick's College / DCU. She was elected to the Royal Irish Academy in 2016. In 2003, Nic Eoin and Brian Lalor were consultant editors for Literature in Irish in The Encyclopaedia of Ireland. In 2022, she was made an honorary fellow of Trinity College.

Her work has been published by An Clóchomhar and Cló Iar-Chonnacht.

== Articles ==
- "Prose Writing in Irish Today", pp. 131–139, A New View of the Irish Language, eds. Caoilfhionn Nic Pháidín and Seán Ó Cearnaigh, Cois Life, Dublin, 2008.

== Books ==
- An Litríocht Réigiúnach, An Clóchomhar, 1982.
- Eoghan Ó Tuairisc: Beatha agus Saothar, An Clóchomhar, 1988.
- An Ghaeilge i gCill Chainnigh, Comhar naMúinteoirí Gaeilge, 1993.
- B’Ait LeoBean: Gnéithe den Idé-eolaíocht Inscne i dTraidisiún Liteartha na Gaeilge, An Clóchomhar, 1998
- Ar an gCoigríoch, Cló Iar-Chonnacht
- Ó Theagasc Teanga go Sealbhú Teanga: Múineadh agus Foghlaim na Gaeilge ar an Tríú Leibhéal(with Ríona Ní Fhrighil), Cois Life, 2009.
- Gaolta Gairide, Cois Life, 2010,
- Trén bhFearann Breac, Cois Life, 2013
