= McCarney =

McCarney is a surname. Notable people with the surname include:

- Dan McCarney (born 1953), American football coach
- Jamie McCarney, Australian actor
- Wayne McCarney (born 1966), Australian cyclist

== See also ==
- McCartney (surname)
