= Seán Ó Cearnaigh =

Irish academic and scholar

Academic work
- Institutions: Dublin Institute for Advanced Studies

Seán Ó Cearnaigh is an Irish academic and scholar. He taught at the Dublin Institute for Advanced Studies from 1990–94, and has published books on the Irish language.

== Bibliography ==
- An Stad: croílár na hAthbheochana, Comhar, 1993.
- Éigse Éireann/Poetry Ireland Review 39 - Eagrán Speisialta Gaeilge, 1993.
- Scríbhneoirí na Gaeilge 1945-1995, Comhar, 1995.
- Lux Aeterna agus Dánta Eile, Eoghan Ó Tuairisc (editor), Cois Life, 2000
- A New View of the Irish Language (edited with Caoilfhionn Nic Pháidín), Cois Life, 2000.
- "The Reformation and the Irish Book: 1567-1645" in The Printed Book in Irish: 1557-2000, Oxford, 2014
