= List of third-party and independent performances in Montana state legislative elections =

Hundreds of third-party, independent, and write-in candidates have run for state office in the state of Montana. Only candidates who achieved more than 5% of the vote are included.

General election returns before 1960 and in 1968 are currently unavailable.

== Candidate won seat ==
=== State house ===
Election	District	Party	Candidate	Votes	%	Place	Ref
2006	12	Constitution	Rick Jore	2,045	55.45 / 100	Elected; 1st of 2	

== Candidate placed ahead of major party nominee ==
=== State house ===
Election	District	Party	Candidate	Votes	%	Place	Ref
2004	12	Constitution	Rick Jore	1,559	36.89 / 100	1st of 3 Tied with Democrat (Note: The Montana Supreme Court ruled the election in favor of the Democratic candidate Jeanne Windham); Beat Republican	
2002	73	Constitution	Rick Jore	1,339	42.87 / 100	2nd of 3 Beat Republican	
1980	53	Independent	G. Kay Carpenter	1,144	33.08 / 100	2nd of 3 Beat Republican	
1980	82	Write-in	Bill Hand	889	29.57 / 100	2nd of 3 Beat Democrat	

== Other candidates ==
In multi-winner elections, candidates' vote percentages are multiplied by the number of representative seats available.

=== State senate ===
Election	District	Party	Candidate	Votes	%	Place	Ref
2024	45	Independent	Kelley Durbin-Williams	1,001	7.81 / 100	3rd of 3	
2020	36	Libertarian	John Lamb	2,706	20.45 / 100	2nd of 2	
2020	45	Libertarian	Devin Braaten	581	5.06 / 100	3rd of 3	
2018	1	Libertarian	Austen Lee Nelson	1,484	16.83 / 100	2nd of 2	
2018	43	Independent	Laura Garber	4,274	37.94 / 100	2nd of 2	
2016	39	Libertarian	Dick Motta	623	7.07 / 100	3rd of 3	
2014	33	Libertarian	Joan Stanley	451	6.50 / 100	3rd of 3	
2012	7	Libertarian	John Marshall	779	7.63 / 100	3rd of 3	
2012	45	Libertarian	Rob McCoy	883	7.90 / 100	3rd of 3	
2010	44	Libertarian	Dan Cox	1,047	11.92 / 100	3rd of 3	
2008	6	Constitution	M. Neal Donohue	2,367	25.86 / 100	2nd of 2	
2008	50	Constitution	Kandi Matthew-Jenkins	2,733	28.99 / 100	2nd of 2	
2006	8	Libertarian	Kandi Matthew-Jenkins	970	17.85 / 100	2nd of 3	
2006	8	Independent	Long Standing Bear Chief	618	11.37 / 100	3rd of 3	
2006	11	Constitution	Johnathan Martin	1,032	17.78 / 100	2nd of 3	
2006	11	Libertarian	Mike Kaszula	480	8.27 / 100	3rd of 3	
2004	6	Constitution	Kurtis Oliverson	462	5.07 / 100	3rd of 3	
2004	38	Independent	Timothy S. Presley	1,668	24.06 / 100	2nd of 2	
2000	19	Reform	Dennis E. Sullivan Jr.	1,330	18.99 / 100	2nd of 2	
1998	23	Natural Law	Rebecca Scott	1,049	24.54 / 100	2nd of 2	
1998	41	Reform	James Rostorfer	1,032	17.40 / 100	2nd of 2	
1996	32	Reform	Linda Lightfoot	559	5.86 / 100	3rd of 3	
1992	9	Independent	Evert Gustafson	872	12.81 / 100	3rd of 3	
1982	11	Libertarian	Mike Tanchek	1.574	34.11 / 100	2nd of 2	
1982	18	Libertarian	Duncan Scott	345	7.35 / 100	3rd of 3	
1982	47	Libertarian	Gary Palm	629	10.38 / 100	3rd of 3	
1980	27	Independent	Gene Delaney	607	8.35 / 100	3rd of 3	
1980	41	Independent	Douglas Allen	2,312	33.34 / 100	2nd of 2	
1976	29	Independent	Tom Dailey	1,531	30.99 / 100	2nd of 2	
1974	23	American	Harry Cameron	362	5.97 / 100	3rd of 3	
1970	27 (1-seat)	Independent	Larry McCarthy	597	15.89 / 100	3rd of 3	

=== State house ===
Election	District	Party	Candidate	Votes	%	Place	Ref
2024	51	Independent	Janna Hafer	2,309	42.58 / 100	2nd of 2	
2024	76	Libertarian	Elena Gagliano	1,349	21.47 / 100	2nd of 2	
2022	8	Libertarian	Sid Daoud	1,240	27.39 / 100	2nd of 2	
2022	22	Libertarian	Tony Rosales	207	6.50 / 100	3rd of 3	
2022	87	Independent	Will Lovette Moore	1,505	27.27 / 100	2nd of 2	
2020	7	Libertarian	Nicholas Ramlow	260	5.38 / 100	3rd of 3	
2020	13	Libertarian	Cade Stiles	493	7.32 / 100	3rd of 3	
2020	20	Libertarian	George Anthony Schultz	762	15.08 / 100	2nd of 2	
2020	37	Libertarian	Jacob Kitson	603	9.95 / 100	2nd of 2	
2020	43	Libertarian	Melody Benes	1,496	29.62 / 100	2nd of 2	
2020	62	Libertarian	Francis Wendt	2,079	25.97 / 100	2nd of 2	
2020	64	Libertarian	Doug Campbell	450	5.20 / 100	3rd of 3	
2020	67	Libertarian	Andrew Schaefer	363	5.18 / 100	3rd of 3	
2020	80	Libertarian	Ron Vandevender	1,185	17.12 / 100	2nd of 2	
2018	5	Libertarian	Cindy Dyson	1,734	30.87 / 100	2nd of 2	
2018	7	Libertarian	Sid Dauod	1,440	31.35 / 100	2nd of 2	
2018	10	Libertarian	Bill Jones	1,100	20.28 / 100	2nd of 2	
2018	28	Independent	Robert Sivertsen	1,179	30.63 / 100	2nd of 3	
2018	28	Libertarian	Conor Burns	401	10.41 / 100	3rd of 3	
2018	30	Libertarian	Kathryn G. H. Nicholes	862	17.76 / 100	2nd of 2	
2018	50	Libertarian	Nathan McKenty	190	5.33 / 100	3rd of 3	
2018	61	Libertarian	A. Alexander Fetto	1,648	25.14 / 100	2nd of 2	
2018	69	Libertarian	Joshua-Luke O'Connor	1,061	19.67 / 100	2nd of 2	
2018	70	Libertarian	Chris Richards	1,048	18.25 / 100	2nd of 2	
2018	71	Libertarian	Michael White	844	13.34 / 100	3rd of 3	
2016	6	Libertarian	Ian Wheeler	313	5.49 / 100	3rd of 3	
2016	10	Independent	James H. Swanson	1,516	26.98 / 100	2nd of 2	
2016	43	Libertarian	Josh Daniels	334	7.68 / 100	3rd of 3	
2016	57	Libertarian	Andrew T. Forcier	748	14.97 / 100	2nd of 2	
2016	80	Libertarian	Valerie Clague	503	8.81 / 100	3rd of 3	
2014	15	Constitution	Joe Read	775	42.62 / 100	2nd of 2	
2014	54	Libertarian	Jeffrey A. Hill	207	8.81 / 100	3rd of 3	
2014	74	Independent	John Michael Driscoll	1,274	43.97 / 100	2nd of 2	
2014	94	Independent	Gary Marbut	1,700	49.30 / 100	2nd of 2	
2012	3	Libertarian	Shawn Guymon	235	5.14 / 100	3rd of 3	
2012	14	Independent	Jessie Nichols	1,053	21.52 / 100	3rd of 3	
2012	26	Libertarian	Tim Martin	984	29.15 / 100	2nd of 2	
2012	70	Independent	Christopher Burke	837	13.14 / 100	3rd of 3	
2012	71	Independent	Kim Miller	2,481	42.83 / 100	2nd of 2	
2012	84	Libertarian	Scott Vandevender	437	7.85 / 100	3rd of 3	
2012	87	Libertarian	Karen Fisher	451	8.23 / 100	3rd of 3	
2012	89	Libertarian	Andy Elwell	373	6.54 / 100	3rd of 3	
2012	90	Libertarian	Toby Martin	1,315	27.01 / 100	2nd of 2	
2010	3	Independent	Shawn Guymon	286	8.56 / 100	3rd of 3	
2010	8	Independent	Bill Jones	294	10.53 / 100	3rd of 3	
2010	11	Green	Cheryl Wolfe	1,052	24.97 / 100	2nd of 2	
2010	22	Constitution	Johnathan D. Martin	259	11.73 / 100	3rd of 3	
2010	84	Libertarian	Ron Vandevender	726	18.15 / 100	2nd of 2	
2010	87	Libertarian	Tobias Z. Martin	769	17.65 / 100	2nd of 2	
2010	88	Constitution	Russ Vogel	851	19.24 / 100	2nd of 2	
2010	90	Libertarian	Arlin Bird	213	5.15 / 100	3rd of 3	
2010	99	Constitution	Kandi Matthew-Jenkins	290	8.51 / 100	3rd of 3	
2008	6	Constitution	Timothy Martin	321	5.18 / 100	3rd of 3	
2008	22	Constitution	Johnathan Martin	788	24.58 / 100	2nd of 2	
2008	56	Independent	George Day	2,000	36.98 / 100	2nd of 2	
2006	1	Constitution	Russell Brown	172	5.14 / 100	3rd of 3	
2006	2	Constitution	Freeman Johnson	209	5.40 / 100	3rd of 3	
2006	3	Constitution	Tad Rosenberry	198	5.54 / 100	3rd of 3	
2006	6	Constitution	Rick Komenda	574	11.91 / 100	3rd of 3	
2006	13	Independent	Gordon Hall	257	5.60 / 100	3rd of 3	
2006	23	Constitution	Christopher Gregory	682	26.92 / 100	2nd of 2	
2006	35	Constitution	Torry Fair MacLean	663	17.08 / 100	2nd of 2	
2006	96	Constitution	Kandi Matthew-Jenkins	188	5.12 / 100	3rd of 3	
2004	7	Constitution	Timothy R. Martin	217	5.32 / 100	3rd of 3	
2004	13	Constitution	Kent Holtz	259	6.10 / 100	3rd of 3	
2004	22	Constitution	Jonathan Martin	219	6.90 / 100	3rd of 3	
2004	23	Constitution	Christopher Gregory	548	18.84 / 100	2nd of 3	
2004	23	Green	Paul Stephens	263	9.04 / 100	3rd of 3	
2004	24	Constitution	Philip N. DuPaul	615	30.78 / 100	2nd of 2	
2004	61	Constitution	Joel Boniek	409	8.03 / 100	3rd of 3	
2004	69	Independent	Mary Newman Hardin	1,690	31.13 / 100	2nd of 2	
2004	74	Independent	Dave Stratton	922	19.16 / 100	3rd of 3	
2004	75	Green	John McCracken	454	12.01 / 100	2nd of 2	
2004	76	Independent	Bob Harper	848	28.06 / 100	2nd of 2	
2002	13	Green	Christine C. Frazier	96	5.08 / 100	3rd of 3	
2002	14	Green	Scott N. Proctor	182	6.77 / 100	3rd of 3	
2002	30	Libertarian	Adam L. Forslund	370	21.30 / 100	2nd of 2	
2002	32	Green	Kelly Pollington	827	19.83 / 100	2nd of 2	
2002	41	Constitution	Kent Holtz	122	10.74 / 100	3rd of 3	
2002	42	Constitution	Terry Poupa	184	6.66 / 100	3rd of 3	
2002	43	Constitution	Jonathan D. Martin	204	6.62 / 100	3rd of 3	
2002	66	Libertarian	John Jenkins	369	15.11 / 100	2nd of 2	
2002	69	Independent	Greg Lind	1,829	44.88 / 100	2nd of 2	
2002	80	Constitution	Gary E. Hall	222	6.56 / 100	3rd of 3	
2002	81	Independent	Pete Zarnowski	1,268	37.93 / 100	2nd of 2	
2000	25	Independent	Clayton Bryington	366	7.78 / 100	3rd of 3	
2000	38	Reform	Kathryn R. Sullivan	786	22.80 / 100	2nd of 2	
2000	39	Independent	Vanessa Martin	629	12.63 / 100	3rd of 3	
2000	40	Reform	Dan Hutchings	258	5.14 / 100	3rd of 3	
2000	41	Constitution	Johnathan D. Martin	152	9.58 / 100	3rd of 3	
2000	42	Constitution	Terry M. Poupa	756	22.13 / 100	2nd of 2	
2000	46	Constitution	Phillip N. DuPaul	129	5.60 / 100	3rd of 3	
2000	61	Libertarian	Erik C. Jerde	518	8.37 / 100	3rd of 3	
2000	62	Constitution	Lou Hatch	274	5.93 / 100	3rd of 3	
2000	66	Constitution	Kandi Matthew-Jenkins	698	19.90 / 100	2nd of 2	
2000	67	Constitution	Steve Larsen	740	20.23 / 100	2nd of 2	
2000	68	Constitution	Larry D. Foust	182	5.26 / 100	3rd of 4	
2000	73	Constitution	Rick Jore	1,818	49.26 / 100	2nd of 2	
2000	75	Libertarian	Fred L. Fekete	263	5.46 / 100	3rd of 3	
2000	77	Constitution	Timothy Martin	1,105	24.89 / 100	2nd of 2	
2000	81	Reform	Jerome F. Johnson	653	17.25 / 100	2nd of 2	
1998	48	Independent	Stephen White	306	10.87 / 100	3rd of 3	
1998	67	Libertarian	Mike Fellows	558	20.55 / 100	2nd of 2	
1998	84	Natural Law	Anne Scott Markle	836	28.46 / 100	2nd of 2	
1998	86	Natural Law	Clay Stephens	217	7.18 / 100	3rd of 3	
1998	98	Write-in	Bill Whitehead	367	20.09 / 100	2nd of 2	
1996	20	Independent	Jim Bennett	209	5.22 / 100	3rd of 3	
1996	31	Natural Law	Jane Stevens Pappin	289	5.76 / 100	3rd of 3	
1996	60	Write-in	Jeanette McKee	2,063	46.23 / 100	2nd of 2	
1996	67	Libertarian	Mike Fellows	703	19.21 / 100	2nd of 2	
1996	72	Independent	Bill Meadows	665	15.33 / 100	3rd of 3	
1994	67	Independent	Dez Freeman	220	7.03 / 100	3rd of 3	
1992	74	Write-in	David Hoffman	897	20.47 / 100	3rd of 3	
1990	96	Libertarian	Montayne John D.	161	7.47 / 100	3rd of 3	
1986	6	Libertarian	Walter Deets	296	7.39 / 100	3rd of 3	
1984	1	Libertarian	Mike Tanchek	410	12.02 / 100	3rd of 3	
1984	36	Libertarian	Diane Stokes	556	15.01 / 100	3rd of 3	
1984	57	Libertarian	Michael Wanger	302	8.12 / 100	3rd of 3	
1982 (Note: Original election returns show independent candidate Geraldine W. Travis earning 26.92% of the vote in District 43 in Cascade County, but results for that seat are likely to be incomplete as only 104 votes were cast total for all candidates)	15	Libertarian	Jeff L. Ross	167	5.23 / 100	3rd of 3	
1982	16	Libertarian	Walter Deets	405	9.01 / 100	3rd of 3	
1982	58	Write-in	Thomas R. Conroy	1,646	46.26 / 100	2nd of 2	
1982	70	Libertarian	David Field	188	5.01 / 100	3rd of 3	
1982	83	Libertarian	Gary Scheer	745	20.18 / 100	2nd of 2	
1982	86	Libertarian	Michael A. Hall	302	14.75 / 100	2nd of 2	
1982	94	Libertarian	Harley R. Harris	355	16.84 / 100	2nd of 2	
1982	96	Libertarian	Chris Mullen	194	7.55 / 100	3rd of 3	
1982	98	Libertarian	Brad Bardwell	147	5.16 / 100	3rd of 3	
1980	15	Libertarian	Jeff L. Ross	326	8.96 / 100	3rd of 3	
1980	22	Libertarian	Mike Tanchek	1,174	40.84 / 100	2nd of 2	
1980	39	Libertarian	Charles N. Steele	231	10.94 / 100	3rd of 3	
1980	41	Libertarian	William D. Jacobsen	249	8.48 / 100	3rd of 3	
1976	26	Independent	Dale Bryson	686	17.76 / 100	3rd of 3	
1976	50	Independent	Faye Hanson Christofferson	452	12.79 / 100	3rd of 3	
1976	58	Independent	Dale Kindness	610	23.64 / 100	2nd of 2	
1976	68	Independent	C. C. Custer	361	11.27 / 100	3rd of 3	
1976	71	Independent	Don Scanlin	567	14.30 / 100	3rd of 3	
1976	75	Independent	Douglas Rand	999	23.16 / 100	3rd of 3	
1976	87	Independent	Tom Christie	1,331	44.96 / 100	2nd of 2	
1974	23	Independent	Jack J. Nichols	470	15.44 / 100	3rd of 3	
1974	25	Write-in	Ralph Morin	686	29.34 / 100	2nd of 2	
1974	58	American	Ed Dobson	348	15.58 / 100	3rd of 3	
1974	88	Write-in	Calla Shea	121	7.32 / 100	2nd of 2	
1972	14 (4-seat)	Independent	Frank R. Hewitt	1,523	11.87 / 100	9th of 9	
1970	23 (7-seat)	Independent	John Finnegan	5,168	23.60 / 100	9th of 9	
1966	13 (2-seat)	Independent	Carl Tysel	821	15.17 / 100	5th of 5	

== Candidates elected without detailed returns ==
Many more third-party candidates have served in the Montana State Legislature, but a lack of readily available election returns means it can not be easily proven that candidates were actually elected on third-party tickets rather than switching parties while in office.

=== State senate ===
Election	District	Party	Candidate	Ref
1958	Rosebud	Independent	R. C. Harken	
1948	Prairie	Independent	Charles Brown	
1948	Sweet Grass	Independent	Leo J. Cremer	
1932	Golden Valley	Independent	Henry Thein	
1926	Sheridan	Farmer–Labor	Charles E. Taylor (Note: Originally elected as a Republican in 1922, switched parties by 1924)	
1912	Blaine	Progressive	L. B. Taylor	
1912	Dawson	Progressive	J. M. Boardman	

=== State house ===
Election	District	Party	Candidate	Ref
1958	Deer Lodge (2-seat)	Independent Democrat	Owen P. McNally	
1958	Custer (2-seat)	Independent	Andy W. Elting	
1946	Beaverhead	Independent Democrat	George M. Melton	
1926	Daniels	Farmer–Labor	James T. Sparling	
1926	Sheridan (2-seat)	Farmer–Labor	Robert Larson	
1924	Sheridan (2-seat)	Farmer–Labor	Robert Larson	
1924	Sheridan (2-seat)	Farmer–Labor	A. T. Larsen	
1920	Daniels	Independent	Fred Hansen	
1912	Blaine	Progressive	John Collins	
1912	Dawson (3-seat)	Progressive	E. E. Jordan	
1912	Dawson (3-seat)	Progressive	Walter D. Kemmis	
1912	Flathead (4-seat)	Progressive	A. L. Jordan	
1912	Flathead (4-seat)	Progressive	H. T. Mayfield	
1912	Hill	Progressive	F. A. Carnal	
1912	Lincoln	Silver	Charles H. Connor	
1912	Missoula (4-seat)	Progressive	J. B. Henley	
1912	Ravalli (2-seat)	Progressive	George A. Blair	
1912	Ravalli (2-seat)	Progressive	Charles MacRae	
1912	Rosebud (2-seat)	Progressive	John Davidson	
1912	[data missing]	Progressive	6 others	
