= 2020 United States presidential election in Montana =

- November 3, 2020
- Turnout: 81.33% (▲6.89 pp)

Nominee	Donald Trump	Joe Biden
Party	Republican	Democratic
Home state	Florida	Delaware
Running mate	Mike Pence	Kamala Harris
Electoral vote	3	0
Popular vote	343,602	244,786
Percentage	56.92%	40.55%

Trump
40–50%
50–60%
60–70%
70–80%
80–90%
90–100%
Biden
40–50%
50–60%
60–70%
70–80%
80–90%
90–100%
Tie/No Data
President before election
Donald Trump
Republican
Elected President
Joe Biden
Democratic

The 2020 United States presidential election in Montana was held on Tuesday, November 3, 2020, as part of the 2020 United States presidential election in which all 50 states plus the District of Columbia participated. Montana voters chose electors to represent them in the Electoral College via a popular vote, pitting the Republican Party's nominee, incumbent President Donald Trump and running mate Vice President Mike Pence, against Democratic Party nominee, former Vice President Joe Biden, and his running mate California Senator Kamala Harris. Montana had three electoral votes in the Electoral College for the 2020 election.

Trump won Montana 56.92% to 40.55%, a margin of 16.37%, down from the 20.42% margin he scored four years earlier. Prior to this election, most news organizations considered this a state Trump was very likely to win, or otherwise considered a likely red state. Montana has not been won by a Democrat since 1992, and has only been competitive in two elections since then, namely in 1996 and in 2008.

Despite his loss in the state, Biden was able to flip Blaine County, a bellwether that is home to Fort Belknap Indian Reservation. He also narrowed Trump's margins in 31 other counties, including the counties of Lewis and Clark (Helena, the state capital), and to a lesser extent Roosevelt, which holds most of Fort Peck Reservation. Additionally, Biden even widened Hillary Clinton's margin of victory in every other county that she won in 2016. This is the first time since their creation in 1919 and 1912, respectively, that a Democrat has won a presidential election without carrying Roosevelt or Hill county.

== Primary elections ==
The primary elections were held on June 2, 2020.

=== Republican primary ===
Donald Trump ran unopposed in the Republican primary, and thus received all of the state's 27 delegates to the 2020 Republican National Convention.

=== Democratic primary ===
2020 Montana Democratic presidential primary
Candidate	Votes	%	Delegates
Joe Biden	111,706	74.48	18
Bernie Sanders (withdrawn)	22,033	14.69	1
Elizabeth Warren (withdrawn)	11,984	7.99	
No Preference	4,250	2.83	
Total	149,973	100%	19

=== Libertarian nominee ===
The 2020 Libertarian National Convention was held on May 22–24, 2020, selecting Jo Jorgensen, Psychology Senior Lecturer at Clemson University, as their presidential nominee.

== General election ==
=== Predictions ===
Source	Ranking	As of
The Cook Political Report	Likely R	September 10, 2020
Inside Elections	Lean R	September 4, 2020
Sabato's Crystal Ball	Likely R	July 14, 2020
Politico	Likely R	September 8, 2020
RCP	Lean R	August 3, 2020
Niskanen	Likely R	July 26, 2020
CNN	Safe R	August 3, 2020
The Economist	Likely R	September 2, 2020
CBS News	Likely R	August 16, 2020
270towin	Likely R	August 2, 2020
ABC News	Lean R	July 31, 2020
NPR	Likely R	August 3, 2020
NBC News	Likely R	August 6, 2020
538	Likely R	November 2, 2020

=== Polling ===
==== Graphical summary ====
View source data.

==== Aggregate polls ====
Source of poll aggregation	Dates administered	Dates updated	Joe Biden Democratic	Donald Trump Republican	Other/ Undecided (Note: Calculated by taking the difference of 100% and all other candidates combined.)	Margin
270 to Win	October 22–28, 2020	November 3, 2020	44.8%	50.2%	5.0%	Trump +5.4
FiveThirtyEight	until November 2, 2020	November 3, 2020	45.4%	49.8%	4.8%	Trump +4.4
Average			45.1%	50.0%	4.9%	Trump +4.9

==== Polls ====
Poll source	Date(s) administered	Sample size (Note: Key: A – all adults RV – registered voters LV – likely voters V – unclear)	Margin of error	Donald Trump Republican	Joe Biden Democratic	Jo Jorgensen Libertarian	Other	Undecided
Change Research	Oct 29 – Nov 2, 2020	920 (LV)	± 3.5%	50%	45%	2%	1% (Note: "Don't recall" with 1%)	1%
SurveyMonkey/Axios	Oct 20 – Nov 2, 2020	1,021 (LV)	± 4%	52% (Note: Overlapping sample with the previous SurveyMonkey/Axios poll, but more information available regarding sample size)	46%	–	–	–
SurveyMonkey/Axios	Oct 1–28, 2020	1,471 (LV)	± 4.0%	50%	48%	–	–	–
Public Policy Polling/Protect Our Care (Note: Protect Our Care is a pro-Affordable Care Act organization)	Oct 26–27, 2020	886 (LV)	± 3.3%	49%	47%	–	–	3%
Montana State University Billings	Oct 19–24, 2020	546 (LV)	± 4.2%	52%	45%	1%	–	2%
Siena College/NYT Upshot	Oct 18–20, 2020	758 (LV)	± 4.4%	49%	43%	3%	2% (Note: "Someone else" with 2%; would not vote with 0%)	3% (Note: Includes "Refused")
Strategies 360/NBCMT	Oct 15–20, 2020	500 (LV)	± 4.4%	51%	43%	3%	–	4%
RMG Research/PoliticalIQ	Oct 15–18, 2020	800 (LV)	± 3.5%	50% (Note: Standard VI response)	46%	2%	4% (Note: "Someone else" with 4%)	0%
RMG Research/PoliticalIQ	Oct 15–18, 2020	800 (LV)	± 3.5%	48% (Note: Results generated with high Democratic turnout model)	48%	2%	4%	0%
RMG Research/PoliticalIQ	Oct 15–18, 2020	800 (LV)	± 3.5%	52% (Note: Results generated with high Republican turnout model)	44%	2%	4%	0%
Public Policy Polling	Oct 9–10, 2020	798 (V)	± 3.5%	52%	46%	-	2% (Note: "Someone else" with 2%)	0%
Emerson College	Oct 4–7, 2020	500 (LV)	± 3.7%	56%	44%	–	–	–
Data For Progress (D)	Sep 30 – Oct 5, 2020	737 (LV)	± 3.6%	49%	43%	3%	0% (Note: Hawkins (G) with 0%)	5%
Montana State University Bozeman	Sep 14 – Oct 2, 2020	1,607 (LV)	± 3.9%	51%	44%	–	4%	2%
SurveyMonkey/Axios	Sep 1–30, 2020	480 (LV)	–	57%	41%	–	–	2%
Siena College/NYT Upshot	Sep 14–16, 2020	625 (LV)	± 4.8%	49%	42%	2%	2% (Note: Hawkins (G) and would not vote with 1%; "someone else" with 0%)	5%
Fabrizio Ward/Hart Research Associates/AARP	Aug 30 – Sep 5, 2020	800 (LV)	± 3.5%	50%	43%	–	0% (Note: "Refused" with 0%)	6%
SurveyMonkey/Axios	Aug 1–31, 2020	562 (LV)	–	52%	46%	–	–	1%
Expedition Strategies/House Majority PAC (Note: The House Majority PAC exclusively supports Democratic candidates)	Aug 22–27, 2020	400 (LV)	± 4.9%	48%	44%	–	–	7%
Emerson College	Jul 31 – Aug 2, 2020	584 (LV)	± 4.0%	54% (Note: Including voters who lean towards a given candidate)	46%	–	–	–
SurveyMonkey/Axios	Jul 1–31, 2020	527 (LV)	–	53%	44%	–	–	3%
Public Policy Polling/AFSCME (Note: AFSCME endorsed Biden prior to this poll's sampling period)	Jul 23–24, 2020	917 (V)	–	50%	45%	–	–	5%
Spry Strategies/American Principles Project (Note: This poll's sponsor is the American Principles Project, a 501(c)(4) organization that supports the Republican Party.)	Jul 11–16, 2020	700 (LV)	± 3.7%	52%	42%	–	–	6%
Civiqs/Daily Kos	Jul 11–13, 2020	873 (RV)	± 4.2%	49%	45%	-	5% (Note: "Someone else" with 5%)	1%
Public Policy Polling/Election Twitter	Jul 9–10, 2020	1,224 (V)	± 2.8%	51%	42%	–	–	7%
SurveyMonkey/Axios	Jun 8–30, 2020	166 (LV)	–	57%	41%	–	–	2%
University of Montana	Jun 17–26, 2020	517 (RV)	± 4.3%	52%	38%	–	–	10%
Montana State University Bozeman	Apr 10–27, 2020	459 (LV)	± 4.6%	45%	40%	–	11%	5%
The Progress Campaign (D)	Apr 14–21, 2020	1,712 (RV)	± 4.6%	51%	42%	–	–	7% (Note: Listed as "other/not sure")
University of Montana	Feb 12–22, 2020	498 (LV)	± 4.4%	56%	34%	–	–	10%
University of Montana	Sep 26 – Oct 3, 2019	303 (RV)	± 5.6%	54%	47%	–	–	–

Former candidates

Donald Trump vs. Michael Bloomberg

Poll source	Date(s) administered	Sample size	Margin of error	Donald Trump (R)	Michael Bloomberg (D)	Undecided
University of Montana	Feb 12–22, 2020	498 (LV)	± 4.4%	55%	31%	15%

Donald Trump vs. Steve Bullock

Poll source	Date(s) administered	Sample size	Margin of error	Donald Trump (R)	Steve Bullock (D)
University of Montana	Sep 26 – Oct 3, 2019	303 (RV)	± 5.6%	48%	52%

Donald Trump vs. Pete Buttigieg

Poll source	Date(s) administered	Sample size	Margin of error	Donald Trump (R)	Pete Buttigieg (D)	Undecided
University of Montana	Feb 12–22, 2020	498 (LV)	± 4.4%	52%	35%	13%

Donald Trump vs. Kamala Harris

Poll source	Date(s) administered	Sample size	Margin of error	Donald Trump (R)	Kamala Harris (D)
University of Montana	Sep 26 – Oct 3, 2019	303 (RV)	± 5.6%	55%	45%

Donald Trump vs. Amy Klobuchar

Poll source	Date(s) administered	Sample size	Margin of error	Donald Trump (R)	Amy Klobuchar (D)	Undecided
University of Montana	Feb 12–22, 2020	498 (LV)	± 4.4%	53%	31%	15%

Donald Trump vs. Bernie Sanders

Poll source	Date(s) administered	Sample size	Margin of error	Donald Trump (R)	Bernie Sanders (D)	Undecided
University of Montana	Feb 12–22, 2020	498 (LV)	± 4.4%	56%	34%	9%
University of Montana	Sep 26 – Oct 3, 2019	303 (RV)	± 5.6%	54%	46%	–

Donald Trump vs. Elizabeth Warren

Poll source	Date(s) administered	Sample size	Margin of error	Donald Trump (R)	Elizabeth Warren (D)	Undecided
University of Montana	Feb 12–22, 2020	498 (LV)	± 4.4%	57%	33%	10%
University of Montana	Sep 26 – Oct 3, 2019	303 (RV)	± 5.6%	54%	46%	–
Zogby Analytics	Aug 17–23, 2017	403 (LV)	± 4.9%	45%	39%	17%

Hypothetical polling

Donald Trump vs. Generic Democrat

Poll source	Date(s) administered	Sample size	Margin of error	Donald Trump (R)	Generic Democrat (D)	Undecided
Public Policy Polling	Mar 12–13, 2020	903 (V)	± 3.3%	52%	44%	4%

with Cory Booker, Kirsten Gillibrand, Kamala Harris, John Kasich, Beto O'Rourke, Bernie Sanders, Howard Schultz and Elizabeth Warren

Poll source	Date(s) administered	Sample size	Margin of error	Joe Biden (D)	Bernie Sanders (D)	Donald Trump (R)	Other
University of Montana	Feb 21 – Mar 1, 2019	293 (RV)	± 5.72%	14.7%	8.4%	40%	36.8% (Note: "Someone else" with 11.6%; Warren with 5%; "none/do not plan to vote" with 4%; Kasich with 4.4%; Harris with 3.8%; O'Rourke with 3.4%; Booker with 2.4%; Gillibrand with 1% Schultz with 1.2%)

=== Electoral slates ===
These slates of electors were nominated by each party in order to vote in the Electoral College should their candidate win the state:

Donald Trump and Mike Pence Republican Party	Joe Biden and Kamala Harris Democratic Party	Jo Jorgensen and Spike Cohen Libertarian Party
Thelma Baker; Becky Stockton; Brad Tschida	Jean Lemire Dahlman; Katie Sullivan; Cora Neumann	Francis Wendt; Jacob Kitson; Cher Kitson

=== Results ===
2020 United States presidential election in Montana
Party	Candidate	Votes	%	±%
Republican	Donald Trump Mike Pence	343,602	56.92	+0.75
Democratic	Joe Biden Kamala Harris	244,786	40.55	+4.80
Libertarian	Jo Jorgensen Spike Cohen	15,252	2.53	−3.11
Write-in		34	0.01	N/A
Total votes		603,674	100.00	N/A
Republican win				

==== By county ====
County	Donald Trump Republican		Joe Biden Democratic		Various candidates Other parties		Margin		Total
County	#	%	#	%	#	%	#	%	Total
Beaverhead	3,923	69.30%	1,608	28.40%	130	2.30%	2,315	40.89%	5,661
Big Horn	2,207	46.10%	2,491	52.04%	89	1.86%	-284	-5.93%	4,787
Blaine	1,469	47.11%	1,589	50.96%	60	1.92%	-120	-3.85%	3,118
Broadwater	3,173	77.45%	835	20.38%	89	2.17%	2,338	57.07%	4,097
Carbon	4,468	63.35%	2,421	34.33%	164	2.33%	2,047	29.02%	7,053
Carter	775	89.70%	74	8.56%	15	1.74%	701	81.13%	864
Cascade	23,315	58.46%	15,456	38.75%	1,114	2.79%	7,859	19.70%	39,885
Chouteau	1,891	63.78%	991	33.42%	83	2.80%	900	30.35%	2,965
Custer	4,205	71.76%	1,514	25.84%	141	2.41%	2,691	45.92%	5,860
Daniels	799	78.80%	195	19.23%	20	1.97%	604	59.57%	1,014
Dawson	3,758	77.89%	962	19.94%	105	2.18%	2,796	57.95%	4,825
Deer Lodge	2,186	44.69%	2,562	52.38%	143	2.92%	-376	-7.69%	4,891
Fallon	1,375	87.30%	172	10.92%	28	1.78%	1,203	76.38%	1,575
Fergus	4,869	74.83%	1,496	22.99%	142	2.18%	3,373	51.84%	6,507
Flathead	38,321	63.93%	20,274	33.82%	1,343	2.24%	18,047	30.11%	59,938
Gallatin	31,696	44.65%	37,044	52.18%	2,248	3.17%	-5,348	-7.53%	70,988
Garfield	764	93.97%	41	5.04%	8	0.98%	723	88.93%	813
Glacier	1,884	33.54%	3,610	64.27%	123	2.19%	-1,726	-30.73%	5,617
Golden Valley	414	82.31%	78	15.51%	11	2.19%	336	66.80%	503
Granite	1,419	67.51%	638	30.35%	45	2.14%	781	37.16%	2,102
Hill	3,957	55.10%	2,981	41.51%	244	3.40%	976	13.59%	7,182
Jefferson	5,345	65.57%	2,625	32.20%	181	2.22%	2,720	33.37%	8,151
Judith Basin	1,040	77.38%	275	20.46%	29	2.16%	765	56.92%	1,344
Lake	9,322	56.07%	6,916	41.60%	388	2.33%	2,406	14.47%	16,626
Lewis and Clark	21,409	50.64%	19,743	46.70%	1,121	2.65%	1,666	3.94%	42,273
Liberty	821	75.81%	249	22.99%	13	1.20%	572	52.82%	1,083
Lincoln	8,672	73.81%	2,835	24.13%	242	2.06%	5,837	49.68%	11,749
Madison	4,191	68.85%	1,771	29.09%	125	2.05%	2,420	39.76%	6,087
McCone	956	84.75%	155	13.74%	17	1.51%	801	71.01%	1,128
Meagher	833	75.05%	258	23.24%	19	1.71%	575	51.80%	1,110
Mineral	1,828	71.32%	686	26.77%	49	1.91%	1,142	44.56%	2,563
Missoula	26,347	36.85%	43,357	60.64%	1,795	2.51%	-17,010	-23.79%	71,499
Musselshell	2,423	84.10%	413	14.34%	45	1.56%	2,010	69.77%	2,881
Park	6,025	52.08%	5,280	45.64%	264	2.28%	745	6.44%	11,569
Petroleum	298	85.63%	39	11.21%	11	3.16%	259	74.43%	348
Phillips	1,936	81.28%	416	17.46%	30	1.26%	1,520	63.81%	2,382
Pondera	2,031	67.81%	903	30.15%	61	2.04%	1,128	37.66%	2,995
Powder River	970	85.39%	154	13.56%	12	1.06%	816	71.83%	1,136
Powell	2,355	74.08%	752	23.66%	72	2.26%	1,603	50.42%	3,179
Prairie	603	81.05%	126	16.94%	15	2.02%	477	64.11%	744
Ravalli	19,114	67.05%	8,763	30.74%	630	2.21%	10,351	36.31%	28,507
Richland	4,800	82.79%	875	15.09%	123	2.12%	3,925	67.70%	5,798
Roosevelt	1,996	49.69%	1,910	47.55%	111	2.76%	86	2.14%	4,017
Rosebud	2,486	65.89%	1,199	31.78%	88	2.33%	1,287	34.11%	3,773
Sanders	5,660	74.25%	1,820	23.88%	143	1.88%	3,840	50.37%	7,623
Sheridan	1,403	69.11%	574	28.28%	53	2.61%	829	40.84%	2,030
Silver Bow	7,745	41.51%	10,392	55.70%	521	2.79%	-2,647	-14.19%	18,658
Stillwater	4,462	77.95%	1,156	20.20%	106	1.85%	3,306	57.76%	5,724
Sweet Grass	1,840	75.22%	549	22.44%	57	2.33%	1,291	52.78%	2,446
Teton	2,608	70.89%	1,007	27.37%	64	1.74%	1,601	43.52%	3,679
Toole	1,596	75.32%	467	22.04%	56	2.64%	1,129	53.28%	2,119
Treasure	373	81.09%	78	16.96%	9	1.96%	295	64.13%	460
Valley	3,135	73.57%	1,030	24.17%	96	2.25%	2,105	49.40%	4,261
Wheatland	823	77.06%	225	21.07%	20	1.87%	598	55.99%	1,068
Wibaux	516	86.29%	77	12.88%	5	0.84%	439	73.41%	598
Yellowstone	50,772	60.57%	30,679	36.60%	2,370	2.83%	20,093	23.97%	83,821
Totals	343,602	56.92%	244,786	40.55%	15,286	2.53%	98,816	16.37%	603,674

Counties that flipped from Republican to Democratic

- Blaine (largest city: Chinook)

==== By congressional district ====
Montana has one at-large district that is the same as the statewide results.

== Analysis ==
Montana, a sparsely populated state straddling the Mountain and Plains West, has been a red state on the presidential level from 1968 on, voting solidly Republican in the close elections of 1968, 2000, 2004, 2012, and 2016. Since 1964, it has voted Democratic only in 1992, and, aside from that, has been competitive only in 1976, 1988, 1996, and 2008. Montana typically votes substantially to the left of its neighbors in the Mountain West (Idaho and Wyoming) and, more recently, of its neighbors in the Plains West as well (North and South Dakota). Nevertheless, Trump was able to carry the state comfortably on Election Day, although his margin was reduced with respect to 2016.

Trump's principal bases of support were in Glacier Country, southwest Montana, central Montana, and southeast Montana, where he carried the population centers of Flathead County (Kalispell), Ravalli County, Cascade County (Great Falls), and Yellowstone County (Billings), in every case with a higher vote share than he received statewide. He also performed strongly in moderate-size, more rural counties in every region of the state, such as Lincoln and Sanders in Glacier Country, Beaverhead, Madison, and Jefferson in the southwest, Stillwater and Carbon in south central Montana, Fergus in central Montana, Custer in the southeast, and Richland, Dawson, and Valley in the Missouri River Country.

However, Biden was able to keep the margin smaller than in neighboring states by breaking 60% in Missoula County, the state's third-largest county and home to the University of Montana, and winning a majority in Gallatin County, the state's second-largest county and home to Montana State University. Gallatin had been a typically Republican county as recently as 2012, when it voted for Romney. He also held Trump to a 4% margin in Lewis and Clark County, the state's sixth-largest county and home to the state capital, Helena; George W. Bush had won this county twice by double digits. Biden also held onto the traditionally Democratic strongholds of heavily unionized Silver Bow and Deer Lodge Counties, although he still fell short of the typical Democratic vote share in those counties; Trump became the first Republican to crack 40% in Silver Bow since 1956, and got the highest vote share of any Republican in Deer Lodge since 1956. In addition, Biden once again carried majority-Native American Glacier County; and furthered his margins in the city of Whitefish, located in heavily-Republican Flathead County.

Biden flipped the swing county of Blaine; Trump flipped no counties.

Per exit polls by the Associated Press, 49% of voters favored allowing more drilling and mining for natural resources on Montana's public lands; an overwhelming 87% of them backed Trump.

In addition to Trump's victory in Montana, Republican candidates, riding on his coattails, won three other major statewide races, which were expected to be competitive. Incumbent Senator Steve Daines defeated term-limited Governor Steve Bullock in the Montana Senate race, Republican State Auditor Matt Rosendale defeated former state representative Kathleen Williams in the Montana House race, and Republican Representative Greg Gianforte defeated Lt. Gov. Mike Cooney in the governor's race. This marked the first time since 2000 that Montana Republicans have held a trifecta. Montana Republicans also won all five state executive branch seats including the State Auditor, Attorney General, Secretary of State, and Superintendent of Public Instruction.

=== Edison exit polls ===
2020 presidential election in Montana by demographic subgroup (Edison exit polling)
Demographic subgroup	Biden	Trump	% of total vote
Total vote	40.55	56.92	100
Ideology
Liberals	88	8	17
Moderates	64	34	36
Conservatives	7	91	47
Party
Democrats	96	3	22
Republicans	6	92	37
Independents	40	55	41
Gender
Men	33	63	50
Women	47	52	50
Race/ethnicity
White	39	58	88
Non-white	45	50	12
Age
18–24 years old	36	57	10
25–29 years old	25	64	9
30–39 years old	48	50	15
40–49 years old	28	69	15
50–64 years old	46	54	25
65 and older	44	55	25
Sexual orientation
LGBT	–	–	8
Not LGBT	38	60	92
Education
High school or less	32	65	26
Some college education	38	58	34
Associate degree	31	66	10
Bachelor's degree	45	54	18
Postgraduate degree	60	39	12
Region
Northern Rockies	37	61	17
Central Rockies	54	41	21
Southern Rockies	44	54	24
Northern Plains	37	60	18
Southern Plains	25	73	20
Area type
Urban	47	50	24
Suburban	–	–	5
Rural	38	59	70
Family's financial situation today
Better than four years ago	16	89	44
Worse than four years ago	–	–	16
About the same	61	37	39

== See also ==
- United States presidential elections in Montana
- Presidency of Joe Biden
- 2020 United States presidential election
- 2020 Democratic Party presidential primaries
- 2020 Libertarian Party presidential primaries
- 2020 Republican Party presidential primaries
- 2020 United States elections

== Notes ==
Partisan clients
