= 2004 Montana House of Representatives election =

- November 2, 2004

All 100 seats of the Montana House of Representatives 51 seats needed for a majority
- Registered: 638,474▲2.23%
- Turnout: 71.44%▲16.96%
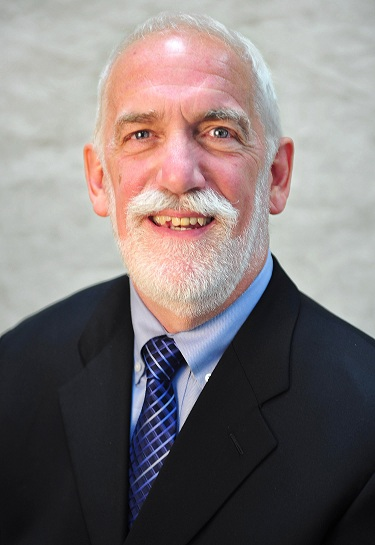

	Majority party	Minority party
Leader	David Wanzenried	Michael Lange
Party	Democratic	Republican
Leader's seat	97th district	55th district
Last election	47	53
Seats won	50	50
Seat change	▲3	▼3
Popular vote	196,372	210,607
Percentage	46.96%	50.36%
Swing	▼0.16%	▼0.02%
- Results: Democratic hold Democratic gain Republican hold Republican gain
Speaker before election
Doug Mood
Republican
Elected Speaker
Gary Matthews
Democratic

An election was held on November 2, 2004, to elect all 100 members to Montana's House of Representatives. The election coincided with elections for other offices, including U.S. President, U.S. House of Representatives, Governor and State Senate. The primary election was held on June 8, 2004.

A net loss of three seats by the Republicans resulted in the House being tied at 50 seats each. Democrats regained control of the House after 12 years by virtue of Governor Brian Schweitzer being a Democrat.

== Predictions ==
Source	Ranking	As of
Rothenberg	Lean R	October 1, 2004

== Results ==
=== Statewide ===
Statewide results of the 2004 Montana House of Representatives election:

Party	Candi- dates	Votes			Seats		
Party	Candi- dates	No.	%	+/–	No.	+/–	%
Republican Party	85	210,607	50.36%	▼0.02%	50	▼3	50.00%
Democratic Party	90	196,372	46.96%	▼0.16%	50	▲3	50.00%
Constitution Party	12	6,685	1.60%	▲0.69%	0	Steady	0.00%
Independent	3	3,460	0.83%	▼0.15%	0	Steady	0.00%
Green Party	4	1,053	0.25%	▼0.15%	0	Steady	0.00%
Total	194	418,177	100.00%	Steady	100	Steady	100.00%

=== District ===
Results of the 2004 Montana House of Representatives election by district:

District	Democratic		Republican		Others		Total votes	Result
District	Votes	%	Votes	%	Votes	%	Total votes	Result
1st district	1,776	47.40%	1,825	48.71%	146	3.90%	3,747	Republican hold
2nd district	1,852	41.76%	2,583	58.24%	—	—	4,435	Republican gain
3rd district	1,497	36.86%	2,564	63.14%	—	—	4,061	Republican hold
4th district	2,600	54.74%	2,150	45.26%	—	—	4,750	Democratic hold
5th district	1,572	31.66%	3,393	68.34%	—	—	4,965	Republican gain
6th district	1,780	35.29%	3,264	64.71%	—	—	5,044	Republican gain
7th district	1,130	27.75%	2,725	66.92%	217	5.33%	4,072	Republican gain
8th district	2,096	52.05%	1,931	47.95%	—	—	4,027	Democratic gain
9th district	—	—	4,052	100.00%	—	—	4,052	Republican hold
10th district	1,201	23.85%	3,834	76.15%	—	—	5,035	Republican hold
11th district	2,004	41.46%	2,830	58.54%	—	—	4,834	Republican gain
12th district (Note: The 12th district was tied after a recount. A Supreme Court ruling resulted in Democrat Jeanne Windham being declared the winner.)	1,559	36.90%	1,107	26.20%	1,559	36.90%	4,225	Democratic gain
13th district	2,288	49.59%	2,112	45.77%	214	4.64%	4,614	Democratic hold
14th district	1,848	42.41%	2,509	57.59%	—	—	4,357	Republican hold
15th district	2,607	100.00%	—	—	—	—	2,607	Democratic gain
16th district	2,480	100.00%	—	—	—	—	2,480	Democratic hold
17th district	—	—	3,763	100.00%	—	—	3,763	Republican gain
18th district	1,999	40.59%	2,926	59.41%	—	—	4,925	Republican gain
19th district	1,727	40.72%	2,255	53.17%	259	6.11%	4,241	Republican hold
20th district	2,063	58.44%	1,467	41.56%	—	—	3,530	Democratic hold
21st district	2,718	78.24%	—	—	756	21.76%	3,474	Democratic gain
22nd district	1,895	59.76%	1,057	33.33%	219	6.91%	3,171	Democratic gain
23rd district	2,097	72.11%	—	—	811	27.89%	2,908	Democratic gain
24th district	1,383	69.22%	—	—	615	30.78%	1,998	Democratic gain
25th district	3,627	100.00%	—	—	—	—	3,627	Democratic gain
26th district	1,638	51.85%	1,521	48.15%	—	—	3,159	Democratic gain
27th district	2,012	47.80%	2,197	52.20%	—	—	4,209	Republican hold
28th district	1,526	33.35%	3,050	66.65%	—	—	4,576	Republican hold
29th district	1,452	31.17%	3,206	68.83%	—	—	4,658	Republican gain
30th district	—	—	4,023	100.00%	—	—	4,023	Republican gain
31st district	2,016	62.67%	1,201	37.33%	—	—	3,217	Democratic gain
32nd district	1,968	59.06%	1,364	40.94%	—	—	3,332	Democratic gain
33rd district	2,415	68.55%	1,108	31.45%	—	—	3,523	Democratic gain
34th district	2,089	60.50%	1,364	39.50%	—	—	3,453	Democratic gain
35th district	2,057	44.39%	2,577	55.61%	—	—	4,634	Republican gain
36th district	—	—	3,515	100.00%	—	—	3,515	Republican gain
37th district	—	—	3,591	100.00%	—	—	3,591	Republican gain
38th district	2,236	50.96%	2,152	49.04%	—	—	4,388	Democratic hold
39th district	—	—	4,097	100.00%	—	—	4,097	Republican hold
40th district	3,368	100.00%	—	—	—	—	3,368	Democratic gain
41st district	1,964	100.00%	—	—	—	—	1,964	Democratic hold
42nd district	2,388	100.00%	—	—	—	—	2,388	Democratic hold
43rd district	2,659	58.78%	1,865	41.22%	—	—	4,524	Democratic hold
44th district	1,986	48.87%	2,078	51.13%	—	—	4,064	Republican gain
45th district	—	—	3,782	100.00%	—	—	3,782	Republican gain
46th district	1,669	32.78%	3,422	67.22%	—	—	5,091	Republican gain
47th district	1,958	40.72%	2,851	59.28%	—	—	4,809	Republican gain
48th district	1,990	50.84%	1,924	49.16%	—	—	3,914	Democratic hold
49th district	1,412	39.09%	2,058	56.98%	142	3.93%	3,612	Republican hold
50th district	1,959	43.59%	2,535	56.41%	—	—	4,494	Republican hold
51st district	1,699	51.47%	1,602	48.53%	—	—	3,301	Democratic hold
52nd district	2,213	55.53%	1,772	44.47%	—	—	3,985	Democratic hold
53rd district	1,766	45.39%	2,125	54.61%	—	—	3,891	Republican gain
54th district	1,706	53.75%	1,468	46.25%	—	—	3,174	Democratic hold
55th district	1,751	35.61%	3,166	64.39%	—	—	4,917	Republican hold
56th district	1,875	34.32%	3,395	62.13%	194	3.55%	5,464	Republican hold
57th district	2,199	39.21%	3,409	60.79%	—	—	5,608	Republican gain
58th district	2,269	51.20%	2,163	48.80%	—	—	4,432	Democratic gain
59th district	2,298	47.82%	2,508	52.18%	—	—	4,806	Republican hold
60th district	1,583	34.91%	2,952	65.09%	—	—	4,535	Republican hold
61st district	1,731	34.01%	2,950	57.96%	409	8.04%	5,090	Republican hold
62nd district	1,874	42.90%	2,494	57.10%	—	—	4,368	Republican hold
63rd district	2,889	48.61%	3,054	51.39%	—	—	5,943	Republican hold
64th district	2,647	55.56%	2,117	44.44%	—	—	4,764	Democratic hold
65th district	2,064	61.19%	1,309	38.81%	—	—	3,373	Democratic hold
66th district	2,783	63.39%	—	—	1,607	36.61%	4,390	Democratic hold
67th district	1,457	30.40%	3,336	69.60%	—	—	4,793	Republican gain
68th district	1,809	35.35%	3,309	64.65%	—	—	5,118	Republican gain
69th district	—	—	3,738	68.87%	1,690	31.13%	5,428	Republican gain
70th district	2,226	40.25%	3,305	59.75%	—	—	5,531	Republican gain
71st district	1,368	26.55%	3,785	73.45%	—	—	5,153	Republican hold
72nd district	—	—	3,440	100.00%	—	—	3,440	Republican gain
73rd district	3,067	100.00%	—	—	—	—	3,067	Democratic hold
74th district	2,734	56.84%	1,154	23.99%	922	19.17%	4,810	Democratic gain
75th district	3,324	87.98%	—	—	454	12.02%	3,778	Democratic gain
76th district	2,174	71.94%	—	—	848	28.06%	3,022	Democratic gain
77th district	2,216	43.34%	2,897	56.66%	—	—	5,113	Republican hold
78th district	1,973	51.06%	1,891	48.94%	—	—	3,864	Democratic hold
79th district	3,046	62.13%	1,857	37.87%	—	—	4,903	Democratic gain
80th district	2,659	58.25%	1,906	41.75%	—	—	4,565	Democratic gain
81st district	3,000	70.87%	1,233	29.13%	—	—	4,233	Democratic gain
82nd district	2,913	61.66%	1,811	38.34%	—	—	4,724	Democratic hold
83rd district	—	—	3,614	100.00%	—	—	3,614	Republican hold
84th district	1,671	35.85%	2,990	64.15%	—	—	4,661	Republican hold
85th district	1,538	51.44%	1,452	48.56%	—	—	2,990	Democratic hold
86th district	3,629	100.00%	—	—	—	—	3,629	Democratic hold
87th district	1,670	34.21%	3,211	65.79%	—	—	4,881	Republican hold
88th district	2,066	47.22%	2,309	52.78%	—	—	4,375	Republican hold
89th district	1,605	32.76%	3,295	67.24%	—	—	4,900	Republican hold
90th district	2,005	41.96%	2,773	58.04%	—	—	4,778	Republican gain
91st district	2,200	52.46%	1,994	47.54%	—	—	4,194	Democratic hold
92nd district	2,928	55.07%	2,389	44.93%	—	—	5,317	Democratic hold
93rd district	4,203	100.00%	—	—	—	—	4,203	Democratic gain
94th district	2,956	62.65%	1,762	37.35%	—	—	4,718	Democratic gain
95th district	2,856	60.44%	1,869	39.56%	—	—	4,725	Democratic gain
96th district	2,540	62.07%	1,552	37.93%	—	—	4,092	Democratic gain
97th district	3,064	64.93%	1,655	35.07%	—	—	4,719	Democratic gain
98th district	2,507	55.37%	2,021	44.63%	—	—	4,528	Democratic hold
99th district	3,100	64.30%	1,721	35.70%	—	—	4,821	Democratic gain
100th district	1,960	47.55%	2,026	49.15%	136	3.30%	4,122	Republican hold
Total	196,372	46.96%	210,607	50.36%	11,198	2.68%	418,177	
