= 2016 United States presidential election in Montana =

- November 8, 2016
- Turnout: 74.44% (▲2.26 pp)

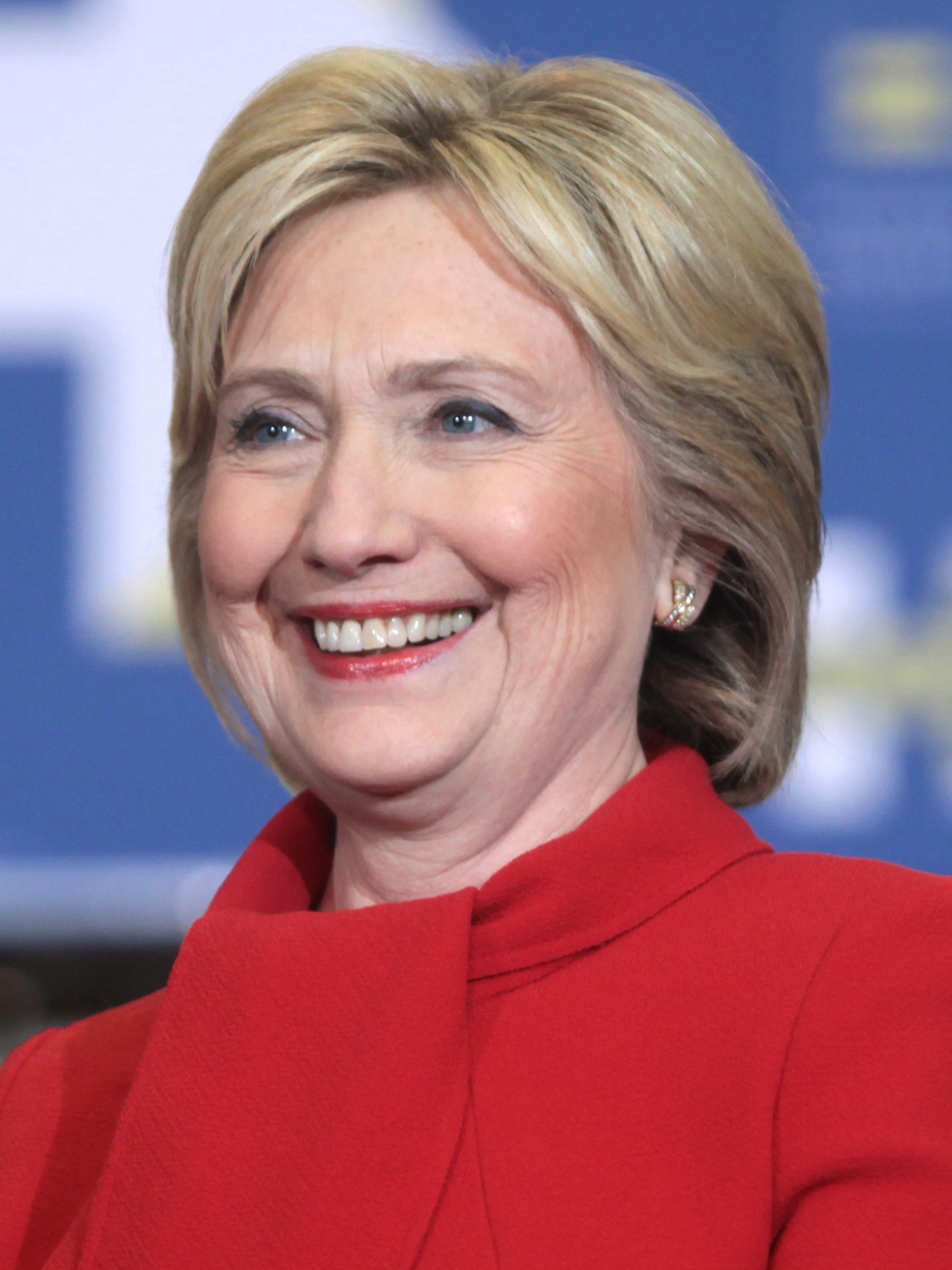

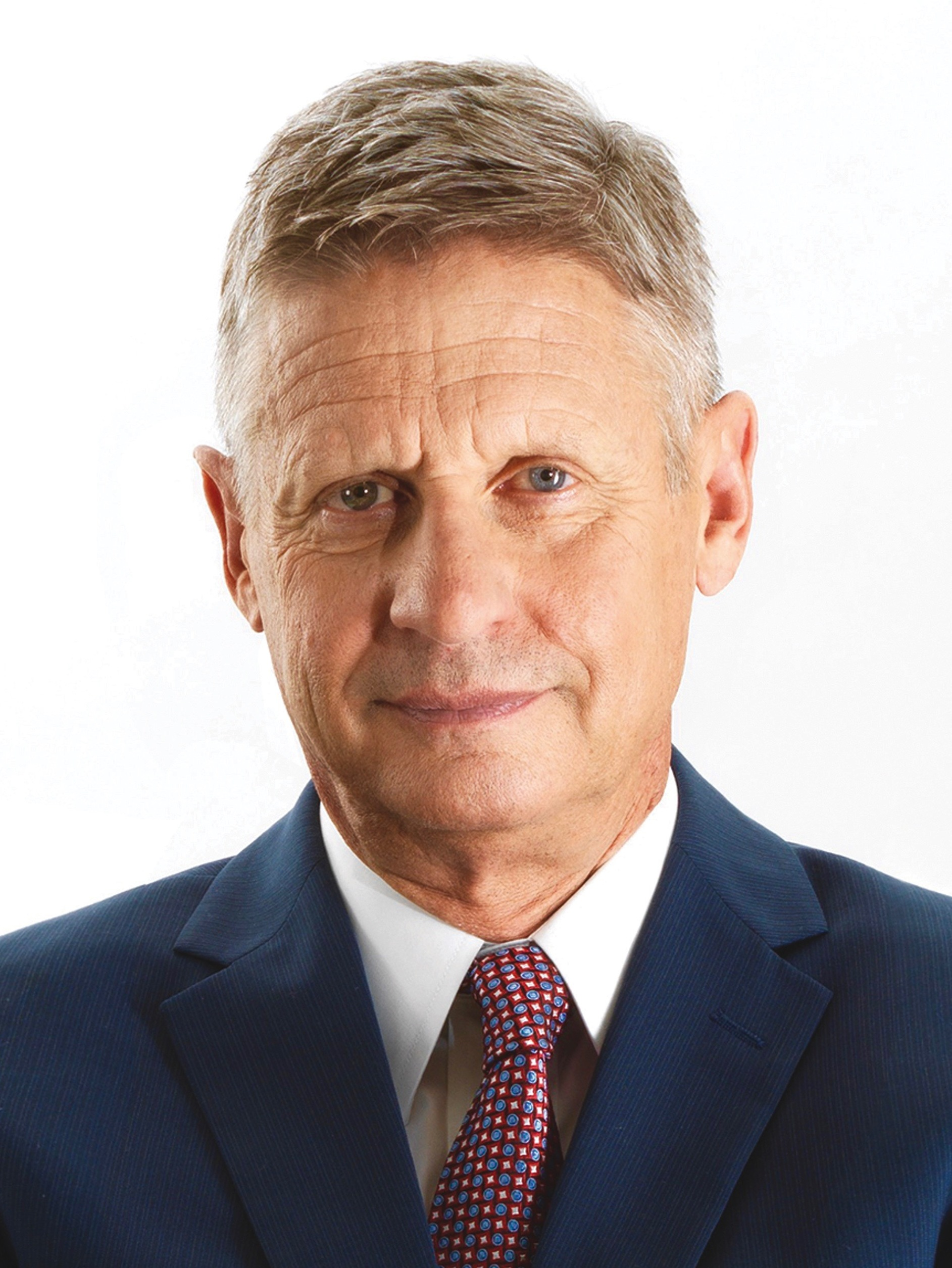
| Nominee | Donald Trump | Hillary Clinton | Gary Johnson |
| Party | Republican | Democratic | Libertarian |
| Home state | New York | New York | New Mexico |
| Running mate | Mike Pence | Tim Kaine | Bill Weld |
| Electoral vote | 3 | 0 | 0 |
| Popular vote | 279,240 | 177,709 | 28,037 |
| Percentage | 56.17% | 35.75% | 5.64% |

Trump
40–50%
50–60%
60–70%
70–80%
80–90%
90–100%
Clinton
40–50%
50–60%
60–70%
70–80%
80–90%
90–100%
Tie/No Data
President before election
Barack Obama
Democratic
Elected President
Donald Trump
Republican

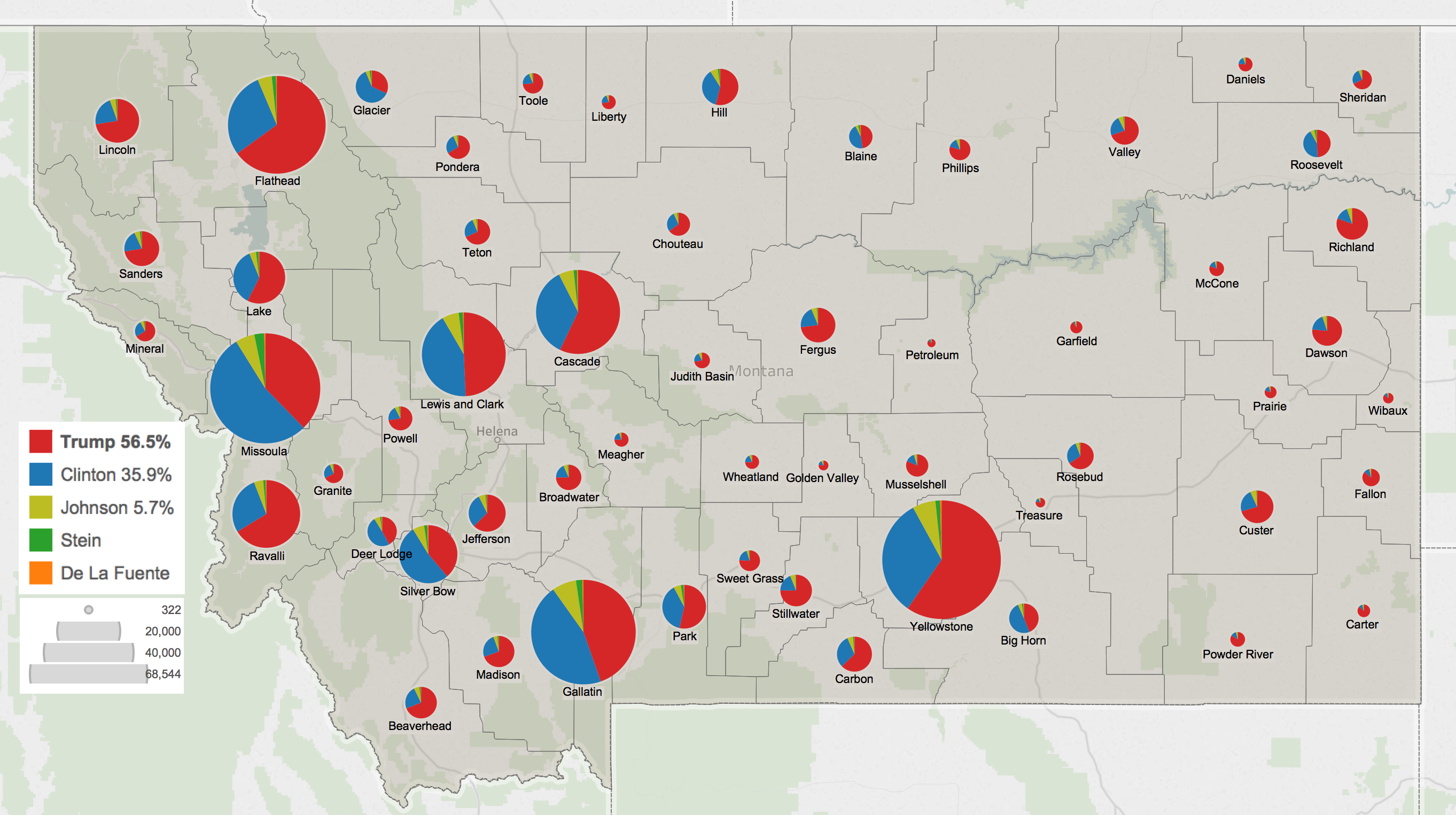
Results by county showing number of votes by size and candidates by color

Treemap of the popular vote by county. Areas are in proportion to the number of votes cast in each county.

The 2016 United States presidential election in Montana was held on Tuesday, November 8, 2016, as part of the 2016 United States presidential election in which all 50 states plus the District of Columbia participated. Montana voters chose electors to represent them in the Electoral College via a popular vote, pitting the Republican Party's nominee, businessman Donald Trump, and running mate Indiana Governor Mike Pence against Democratic Party nominee, former Secretary of State Hillary Clinton, and her running mate Virginia Senator Tim Kaine. Montana has three electoral votes in the Electoral College.

Trump carried the state by a 20.42% margin of victory, exceeding Mitt Romney's 13.64% margin in 2012 and John McCain's 2.38% margin in 2008. Republicans have won Montana in every presidential election since 1996, and in all but one beginning in 1968. Libertarian nominee and third-party candidate Gary Johnson received 5.6% of the vote.

This was Johnson's fifth strongest state, behind his native New Mexico as well as North Dakota, Alaska, and Oklahoma.

== Primary elections ==
=== Democratic primary ===
Two candidates appeared on the Democratic presidential primary ballot:

- Bernie Sanders
- Hillary Clinton

Montana Democratic primary, June 7, 2016
| Candidate | Popular vote | | Estimated delegates | | |
| Candidate | Count | Percentage | Pledged | Unpledged | Total |
|---|---|---|---|---|---|
| Bernie Sanders | 65,156 | 51.56% | 11 | 1 | 12 |
| Hillary Clinton | 55,805 | 44.16% | 10 | 5 | 15 |
| No preference | 5,415 | 4.28% | 0 | 0 | 0 |
| Uncommitted | —N/a | | 0 | 0 | 0 |
| Total | 126,376 | 100% | 21 | 6 | 27 |

=== Republican primary ===
Republican primary results by county: Donald Trump: 60–70%; 70–80%; 80–90%

Five candidates appeared on the Republican presidential primary ballot:

- Jeb Bush (withdrawn)
- Ted Cruz (withdrawn)
- John Kasich (withdrawn)
- Marco Rubio (withdrawn)
- Donald Trump

Montana Republican primary, June 7, 2016
| Candidate | Votes | Percentage | Actual delegate count | | |
| Candidate | Votes | Percentage | Bound | Unbound | Total |
|---|---|---|---|---|---|
| Donald Trump | 115,594 | 73.68% | 27 | 0 | 27 |
| Ted Cruz (withdrawn) | 14,682 | 9.36% | 0 | 0 | 0 |
| John Kasich (withdrawn) | 10,777 | 6.87% | 0 | 0 | 0 |
| No preference | 7,369 | 4.70% | 0 | 0 | 0 |
| Marco Rubio (withdrawn) | 5,192 | 3.31% | 0 | 0 | 0 |
| Jeb Bush (withdrawn) | 3,274 | 2.09% | 0 | 0 | 0 |
| Unprojected delegates: | | | 0 | 0 | 0 |
| Total: | 156,888 | 100.00% | 27 | 0 | 27 |
Source: The Green Papers

== General election ==
=== Predictions ===
| Source | Ranking | As of |
|---|---|---|
| CNN | Safe R | November 4, 2016 |
| Cook Political Report | Safe R | November 7, 2016 |
| Electoral-vote.com | Safe R | November 7, 2016 |
| Rothenberg Political Report | Safe R | November 7, 2016 |
| NBC | Lean R | November 7, 2016 |
| RealClearPolitics | Likely R | November 7, 2016 |

=== Results ===
2016 United States presidential election in Montana
| Party | Candidate | Votes | % |
|---|---|---|---|
| Republican | Donald Trump; Mike Pence | 279,240 | 56.17 |
| Democratic | Hillary Clinton; Tim Kaine | 177,709 | 35.75 |
| Libertarian | Gary Johnson; Bill Weld | 28,037 | 5.64 |
| Green | Jill Stein; Ajamu Baraka | 7,970 | 1.60 |
| Independent | Evan McMullin (write-in); Nathan Johnson (write-in) | 2,297 | 0.46 |
| American Delta | Rocky De La Fuente; Michael Steinberg | 1,570 | 0.32 |
| Constitution | Darrell Castle (write-in); Scott Bradley (write-in) | 296 | 0.06 |
| American | Tom Hoefling (write-in); Steve Schulin (write-in) | 10 | 0.00 |
| Independent | Laurence Kotlikoff (write-in); Edward Leamer (write-in) | 7 | 0.00 |
| Independent | Andrew Basiago (write-in); Karen Kinnison (write-in) | 3 | 0.00 |
| Independent | Robert Buchanan (write-in) | 2 | 0.00 |
| Independent | Joe Exotic (write-in); Douglas Terranova (write-in) | 1 | 0.00 |
| Independent | Mike Smith (write-in); Daniel White (write-in) | 1 | 0.00 |
| Socialist | Mimi Soltysik (write-in); Angela Nicole Walker (write-in) | 1 | 0.00 |
| Libertarian | Darryl Perry (write-in) | 1 | 0.00 |
| Independent | Joe Schriner (write-in) | 1 | 0.00 |
| Independent | Laio Morris (write-in) | 1 | 0.00 |
| Total votes | | 497,147 | 100% |
| Republican win | | | |

==== By county ====
| County | Donald Trump Republican | | Hillary Clinton Democratic | | Various candidates Other parties | | Margin | | Total |
| County | # | % | # | % | # | % | # | % | Total |
|---|---|---|---|---|---|---|---|---|---|
| Beaverhead | 3,353 | 69.15% | 1,143 | 23.57% | 353 | 7.28% | 2,210 | 45.58% | 4,849 |
| Big Horn | 1,853 | 43.73% | 2,094 | 49.42% | 290 | 6.85% | -241 | -5.69% | 4,237 |
| Blaine | 1,268 | 47.24% | 1,202 | 44.78% | 214 | 7.98% | 66 | 2.46% | 2,684 |
| Broadwater | 2,348 | 74.94% | 573 | 18.29% | 212 | 6.77% | 1,775 | 56.65% | 3,133 |
| Carbon | 3,748 | 62.56% | 1,828 | 30.51% | 415 | 6.93% | 1,920 | 32.05% | 5,991 |
| Carter | 678 | 86.26% | 70 | 8.91% | 38 | 4.83% | 608 | 77.35% | 786 |
| Cascade | 19,632 | 56.79% | 12,175 | 35.22% | 2,764 | 7.99% | 7,457 | 21.57% | 34,571 |
| Chouteau | 1,679 | 64.50% | 732 | 28.12% | 192 | 7.38% | 947 | 36.38% | 2,603 |
| Custer | 3,657 | 70.53% | 1,176 | 22.68% | 352 | 6.79% | 2,481 | 47.85% | 5,185 |
| Daniels | 730 | 75.88% | 168 | 17.46% | 64 | 6.66% | 562 | 58.42% | 962 |
| Dawson | 3,320 | 75.30% | 787 | 17.85% | 302 | 6.85% | 2,533 | 57.45% | 4,409 |
| Deer Lodge | 1,763 | 41.92% | 2,058 | 48.93% | 385 | 9.15% | -295 | -7.01% | 4,206 |
| Fallon | 1,279 | 86.19% | 154 | 10.38% | 51 | 3.43% | 1,125 | 75.81% | 1,484 |
| Fergus | 4,269 | 73.10% | 1,202 | 20.58% | 369 | 6.32% | 3,067 | 52.52% | 5,840 |
| Flathead | 30,240 | 63.67% | 13,293 | 27.99% | 3,963 | 8.34% | 16,947 | 35.68% | 47,496 |
| Gallatin | 23,802 | 44.23% | 24,246 | 45.05% | 5,771 | 10.72% | -444 | -0.82% | 53,819 |
| Garfield | 653 | 90.95% | 34 | 4.74% | 31 | 4.31% | 619 | 86.21% | 718 |
| Glacier | 1,620 | 31.92% | 3,121 | 61.50% | 334 | 6.58% | -1,501 | -29.58% | 5,075 |
| Golden Valley | 365 | 77.00% | 71 | 14.98% | 38 | 8.02% | 294 | 62.02% | 474 |
| Granite | 1,192 | 67.08% | 472 | 26.56% | 113 | 6.36% | 720 | 40.52% | 1,777 |
| Hill | 3,478 | 53.96% | 2,371 | 36.79% | 596 | 9.25% | 1,107 | 17.17% | 6,445 |
| Jefferson | 4,177 | 62.21% | 1,998 | 29.76% | 539 | 8.03% | 2,179 | 32.45% | 6,714 |
| Judith Basin | 872 | 72.19% | 235 | 19.45% | 101 | 8.36% | 637 | 52.74% | 1,208 |
| Lake | 7,530 | 57.13% | 4,776 | 36.23% | 875 | 6.64% | 2,754 | 20.90% | 13,181 |
| Lewis and Clark | 16,895 | 47.87% | 14,478 | 41.02% | 3,923 | 11.11% | 2,417 | 6.85% | 35,296 |
| Liberty | 698 | 72.63% | 206 | 21.44% | 57 | 5.93% | 492 | 51.19% | 961 |
| Lincoln | 6,729 | 72.12% | 2,041 | 21.88% | 560 | 6.00% | 4,688 | 50.24% | 9,330 |
| Madison | 3,297 | 69.51% | 1,180 | 24.88% | 266 | 5.61% | 2,117 | 44.63% | 4,743 |
| McCone | 862 | 78.72% | 154 | 14.06% | 79 | 7.22% | 708 | 64.66% | 1,095 |
| Meagher | 729 | 74.62% | 193 | 19.75% | 55 | 5.63% | 536 | 54.87% | 977 |
| Mineral | 1,330 | 66.10% | 519 | 25.80% | 163 | 8.10% | 811 | 40.30% | 2,012 |
| Missoula | 22,250 | 36.64% | 31,543 | 51.95% | 6,929 | 11.41% | -9,293 | -15.31% | 60,722 |
| Musselshell | 1,967 | 80.58% | 332 | 13.60% | 142 | 5.82% | 1,635 | 66.98% | 2,441 |
| Park | 4,980 | 53.21% | 3,595 | 38.41% | 784 | 8.38% | 1,385 | 14.80% | 9,359 |
| Petroleum | 278 | 86.34% | 30 | 9.32% | 14 | 4.34% | 248 | 77.02% | 322 |
| Phillips | 1,723 | 79.36% | 318 | 14.65% | 130 | 5.99% | 1,405 | 64.71% | 2,171 |
| Pondera | 1,799 | 66.07% | 738 | 27.10% | 186 | 6.83% | 1,061 | 38.97% | 2,723 |
| Powder River | 884 | 83.95% | 127 | 12.06% | 42 | 3.99% | 757 | 71.89% | 1,053 |
| Powell | 2,029 | 72.62% | 551 | 19.72% | 214 | 7.66% | 1,478 | 52.90% | 2,794 |
| Prairie | 556 | 80.70% | 100 | 14.51% | 33 | 4.79% | 456 | 66.19% | 689 |
| Ravalli | 14,810 | 65.66% | 6,223 | 27.59% | 1,523 | 6.75% | 8,587 | 38.07% | 22,556 |
| Richland | 3,908 | 80.23% | 671 | 13.78% | 292 | 5.99% | 3,237 | 66.45% | 4,871 |
| Roosevelt | 1,797 | 49.21% | 1,560 | 42.72% | 295 | 8.07% | 237 | 6.49% | 3,652 |
| Rosebud | 2,253 | 65.25% | 987 | 28.58% | 213 | 6.17% | 1,266 | 36.67% | 3,453 |
| Sanders | 4,286 | 72.00% | 1,218 | 20.46% | 449 | 7.54% | 3,068 | 51.54% | 5,953 |
| Sheridan | 1,241 | 67.63% | 477 | 25.99% | 117 | 6.38% | 764 | 41.64% | 1,835 |
| Silver Bow | 6,376 | 38.76% | 8,619 | 52.39% | 1,457 | 8.85% | -2,243 | -13.63% | 16,452 |
| Stillwater | 3,661 | 75.13% | 908 | 18.63% | 304 | 6.24% | 2,753 | 56.50% | 4,873 |
| Sweet Grass | 1,595 | 75.70% | 402 | 19.08% | 110 | 5.22% | 1,193 | 56.62% | 2,107 |
| Teton | 2,170 | 68.07% | 808 | 25.35% | 210 | 6.58% | 1,362 | 42.72% | 3,188 |
| Toole | 1,497 | 73.49% | 402 | 19.73% | 138 | 6.78% | 1,095 | 53.76% | 2,037 |
| Treasure | 351 | 79.23% | 59 | 13.32% | 33 | 7.45% | 292 | 65.91% | 443 |
| Valley | 2,698 | 69.29% | 886 | 22.75% | 310 | 7.96% | 1,812 | 46.54% | 3,894 |
| Wheatland | 702 | 74.21% | 179 | 18.92% | 65 | 6.87% | 523 | 55.29% | 946 |
| Wibaux | 463 | 85.58% | 55 | 10.17% | 23 | 4.25% | 408 | 75.41% | 541 |
| Yellowstone | 40,920 | 58.05% | 22,171 | 31.45% | 7,395 | 10.50% | 18,749 | 26.60% | 70,486 |
| Totals | 279,240 | 55.65% | 177,709 | 35.41% | 44,873 | 8.94% | 101,531 | 20.24% | 501,822 |

Counties that flipped from Democratic to Republican

- Blaine (largest city: Chinook)
- Hill (largest city: Havre)
- Roosevelt (largest city: Wolf Point)

Counties that flipped from Republican to Democratic

- Gallatin (largest city: Bozeman)

==== By congressional district ====
Due to the state's low population, only one congressional district is allocated, the At-Large District. This district covers the entire state, and thus is equivalent to the statewide election results.

| District | Trump | Clinton | Representative |
|---|---|---|---|
| At-large | 56.17% | 35.25% | Ryan Zinke |

== Analysis ==
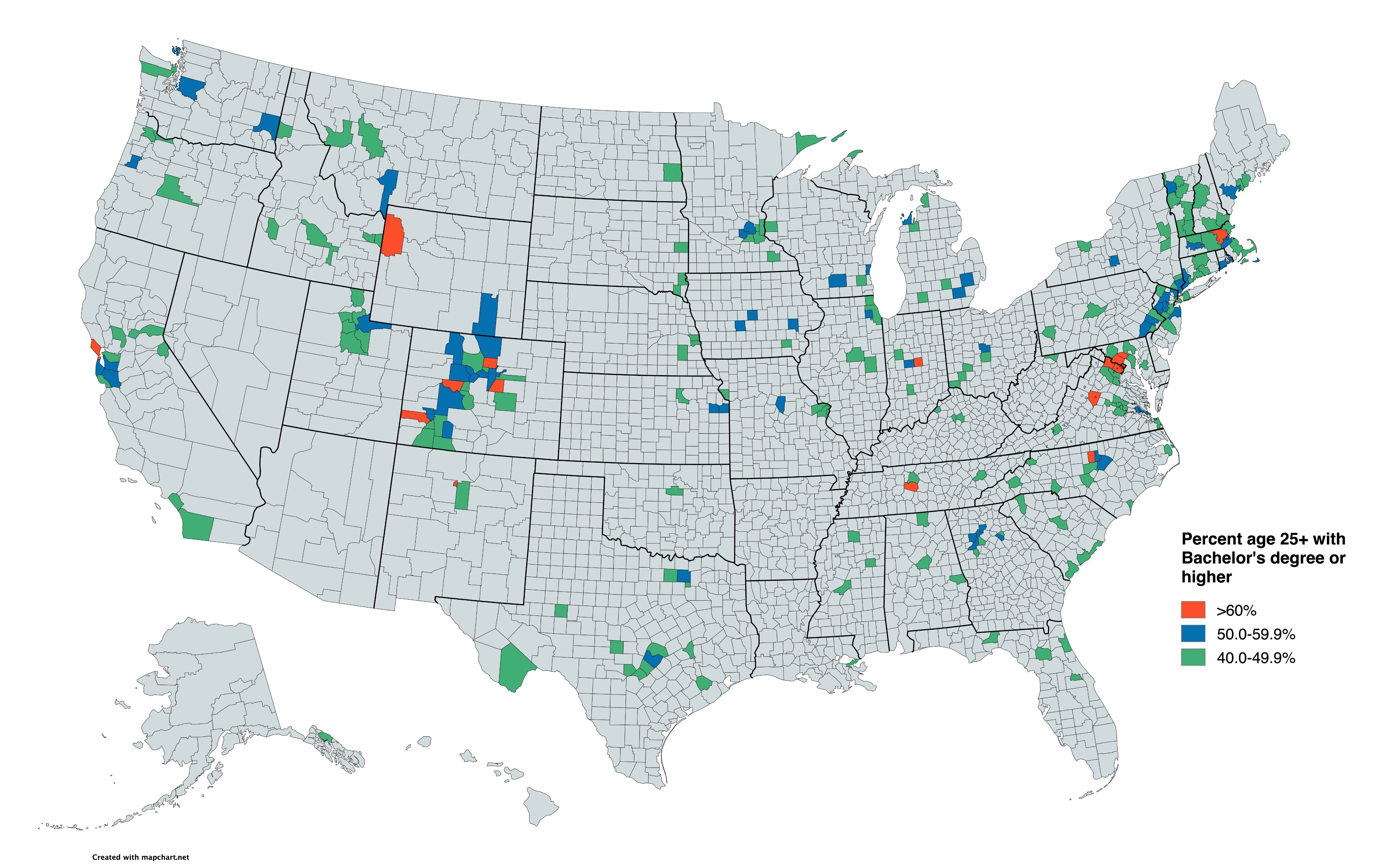
A map of the most college-educated counties in the United States

Like every Republican nominee since 1996, Donald Trump carried Montana's three electoral votes. He won by a large margin, and he swept most of the plains counties in eastern Montana, traditionally the most conservative part of the state, by staggering margins sometimes exceeding 60 points. The eastern part of the state has benefited from the recent energy boom in neighboring North Dakota, and its populace is suspicious and disapproving of the environmental movement championed by Democrats in recent elections. Trump became the first Republican to win Roosevelt County since 1984.

Most counties in the western part of the state were also traditionally Republican, with a ranching-based economy heavily dependent on the raising and production of cattle and hay, particularly in the counties bordering Idaho such as Beaverhead County and Ravalli County. However, an influx of retirees from the West Coast has made the western region more competitive in recent elections.

The only significant counties won by Clinton were Missoula County, where the city of Missoula is located, Gallatin County, where Bozeman is located, and Big Horn County and Glacier County, which are both majority Native American. While sweeping most of the rural, majority white conservative counties of the state, Trump also won in Lewis and Clark County where the capital city of Helena is located, in neighboring Cascade County where Great Falls is located, and in Yellowstone County where the city of Billings is located.

Trump became the first Republican to win the White House without carrying Gallatin County since William McKinley in 1900. This was because Gallatin County (home to Montana State University) is the most highly educated county in Montana, with a majority of adult residents holding a Bachelor's degree (see the map), and was the only county in the state to swing towards Clinton.

== See also ==
- United States presidential elections in Montana
- First presidency of Donald Trump
- 2016 Democratic Party presidential debates and forums
- 2016 Democratic Party presidential primaries
- 2016 Republican Party presidential debates and forums
- 2016 Republican Party presidential primaries
