= 2020 United States Senate election in Montana =

- November 3, 2020
- Turnout: 81.33% ▲
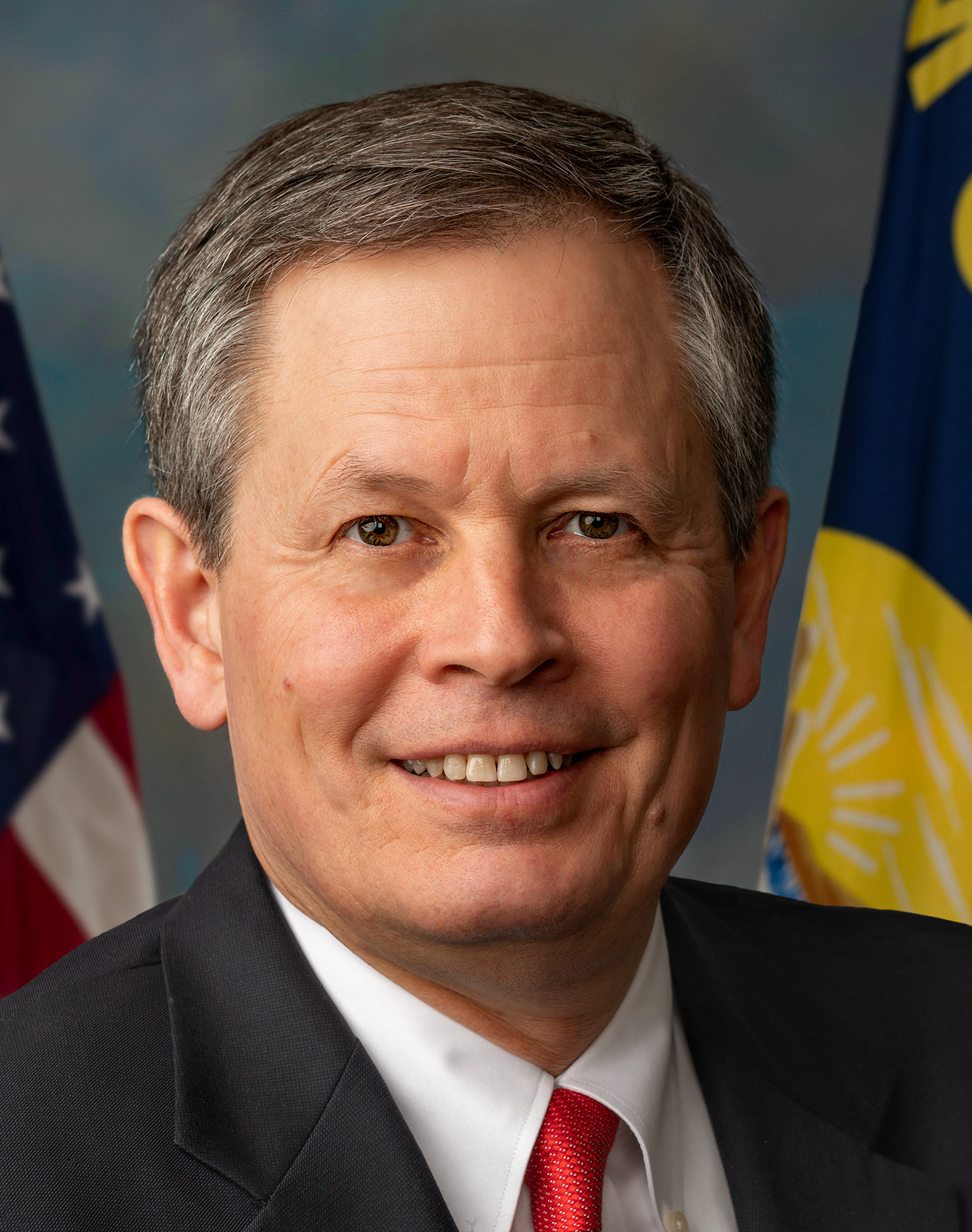

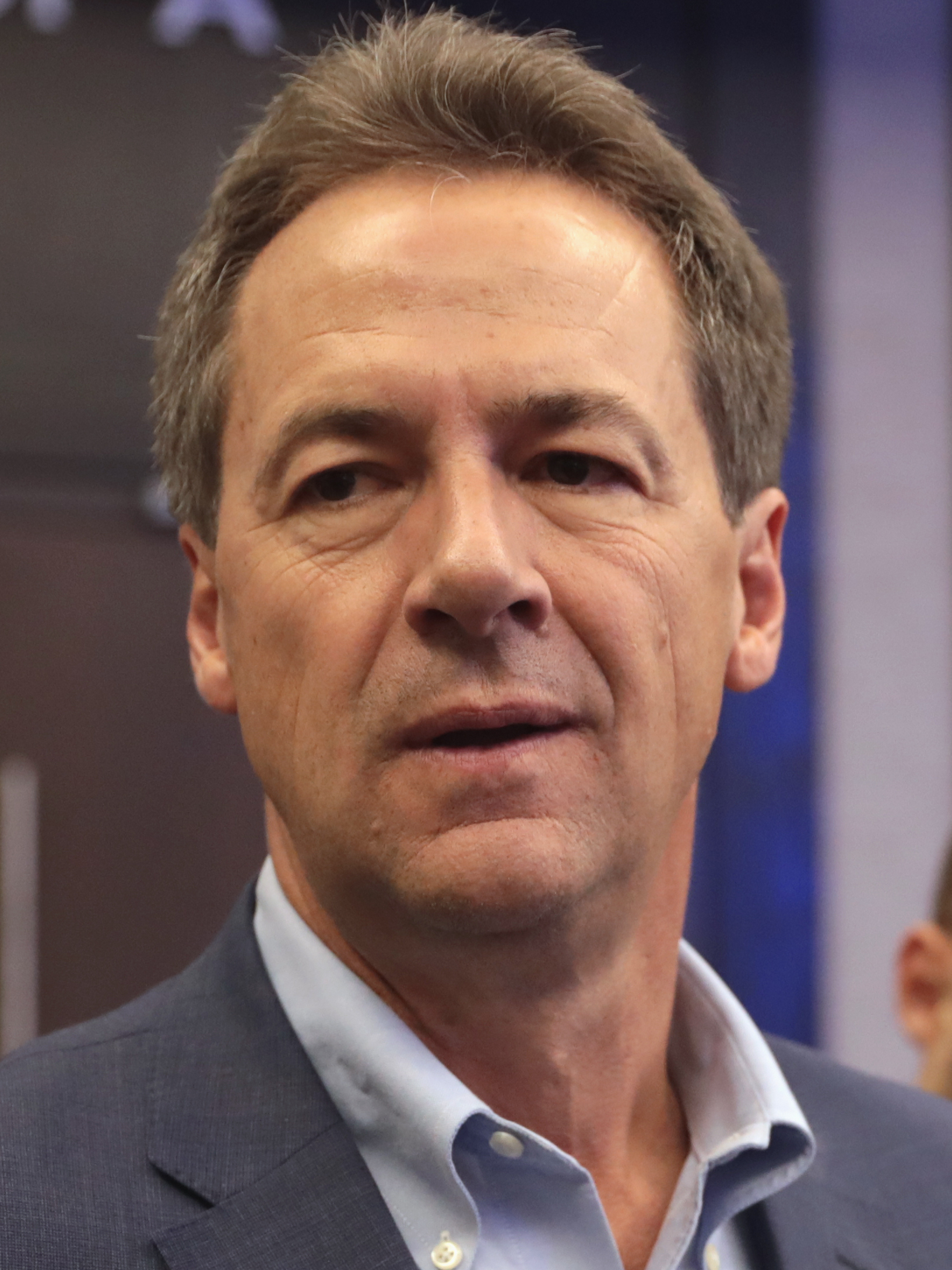
Nominee	Steve Daines	Steve Bullock
Party	Republican	Democratic
Popular vote	333,174	272,463
Percentage	55.01%	44.99%
- Daines: 50–60% 60–70% 70–80% 80–90% >90% Bullock: 50–60% 60–70% 70–80% 80–90% >90% No data
U.S. senator before election
Steve Daines
Republican
Elected U.S. senator
Steve Daines
Republican

The 2020 United States Senate election in Montana was held on November 3, 2020, to elect a member of the United States Senate to represent the state of Montana. Republican incumbent Steve Daines won re-election to a second term, defeating Democratic incumbent governor Steve Bullock.

In the June 2 primary elections, Daines and Bullock secured their nominations with minimal opposition.

Originally, this seat was projected to be a safe Republican hold. However, Bullock entered the race on the last day to file, shifting the dynamics of the contest dramatically; many political pundits then considered it a competitive race and a potential pickup for Democrats. One poll showed Bullock leading by seven points. Democrats outspent Republicans $82 million to $63 million on this race; it was one of the most expensive Senate races in the 2020 cycle. On Election Day, Daines prevailed by a relatively comfortable 10% margin following a trend of Republican Senate candidates outperforming expectations.

Despite his loss, Bullock did outperform Biden, who lost Montana by a 16.4% margin. He also flipped two counties won by Donald Trump in the presidential contest — Lewis and Clark and Roosevelt.

This election marked the first time since 2000 where Montana voted for a Republican governor, president, and senator all on the same ballot. As the Green Party was removed from the ballot and both Libertarian nominees withdrew, this was the first time since 1988 that there were no third-party candidates running for either United States House of Representatives or United States Senate in Montana. This was the first time ever that an incumbent Republican senator was re-elected to this seat.

== Republican primary ==
=== Candidates ===
==== Nominee ====
- Steve Daines, incumbent U.S. senator

==== Eliminated in primary ====
- John Driscoll, former Democratic Speaker of the Montana House of Representatives (1977–1979)
- Daniel Larson, hardware store manager

=== Endorsements ===
Steve Daines

Individuals

- Donald Trump Jr., son of President Donald Trump

=== Results ===
Results by county Daines: 80–90%; 90–100%

Republican primary results
Party	Candidate	Votes	%
Republican	Steve Daines (incumbent)	192,942	88.02%
Republican	John Driscoll	13,944	6.36%
Republican	Daniel Larson	12,319	5.62%
Total votes		219,205	100.00%

== Democratic primary ==
Following Steve Bullock's entry shortly before the March 9 filing deadline, several Democrats dropped from the race.

=== Candidates ===
==== Nominee ====
- Steve Bullock, incumbent governor of Montana and former candidate for president of the United States in 2020

==== Eliminated in primary ====
- John Mues, nuclear engineer and U.S. Navy veteran

==== Withdrawn ====
- Jack Ballard, former professor at Montana State University Billings (endorsed Bullock)
- Wilmot Collins, mayor of Helena (endorsed Bullock)
- Mike Knoles, mathematician, physicist, and data analyst (endorsed Bullock) (remained on ballot)
- Cora Neumann, public health expert and founder of the Global First Ladies Alliance (endorsed Bullock)
- Josh Seckinger, fishing guide (endorsed Bullock)

==== Declined ====
- Michael Punke, writer and former U.S. ambassador to the World Trade Organization
- Brian Schweitzer, former governor of Montana
- Kathleen Williams, former state representative and nominee for Montana's at-large congressional district in 2018 (running for Montana's at-large congressional district)

=== Endorsements ===
Steve Bullock

Federal officials

- Kamala Harris, U.S. senator from California (2017-2021), 2020 Democratic vice presidential nominee

=== Results ===
Results by county Bullock: 80–90%; 90–100%

Democratic primary results
Party	Candidate	Votes	%
Democratic	Steve Bullock	144,949	95.45%
Democratic	John Mues	3,740	2.46%
Democratic	Mike Knoles (withdrawn)	3,165	2.09%
Total votes		151,854	100.00%

== Other candidates ==
=== Libertarian Party ===
After Susan Geise officially withdrew, the Montana Libertarian Party could name a replacement candidate for the general election. However, during a meeting to select a replacement candidate, a majority of party officials selected not to have a replacement candidate, with "none of the above" winning the most votes.

==== Withdrawn ====
- Eric Fulton, Republican candidate for District 65 of the Montana House of Representatives in 2014
- Susan Geise, Lewis and Clark County commissioner and former chair of the Montana Republican Party

=== Green Party ===
==== Disqualified ====
- Wendie Fredrickson, former audit reviewer for Montana State Department of Public Health and Human Services

==== Eliminated in primary ====
- Dennis Daneke, retired college professor

==== Results ====
Results by county Fredrickson Daneke Tie No vote

Green primary results
Party	Candidate	Votes	%
Green	Wendie Fredrickson	504	66.40%
Green	Dennis Daneke	255	33.60%
Total votes		758	100.00%

== General election ==
=== Debate ===
Host	Date & time	Link(s)	Participants	
Host	Date & time	Link(s)	Steve Daines (R)	Steve Bullock (D)
Montana Broadcasters Association	August 8, 2020; 9:30pm MDT		Present	Present
Montana Television Network	October 10, 2020; 5:47pm MDT		Present	Present

=== Predictions ===
Source	Rating	As of
The Cook Political Report	Tossup	October 29, 2020
Inside Elections	Tossup	October 28, 2020
Sabato's Crystal Ball	Lean R	November 2, 2020
Daily Kos	Lean R	October 30, 2020
Politico	Tossup	November 2, 2020
RCP	Tossup	October 23, 2020
DDHQ	Lean R	November 3, 2020
538	Lean R	November 2, 2020
Economist	Lean R	November 2, 2020

=== Additional general election endorsements ===
Steve Daines (R)

U.S. executive branch officials

- Nikki Haley, U.S. Ambassador to the United Nations (2017–2018), 116th governor of South Carolina (2011–2017)
- Donald Trump, 45th president of the United States (2017-2021)

U.S. senators

- Ted Cruz, U.S. senator from Texas (2013-present)
- Lindsey Graham, U.S. senator from South Carolina (2003-present)
- Mitch McConnell, U.S. senator from Kentucky (1985-present) and Senate Majority Leader (2015-2021)
- Marco Rubio, U.S. senator from Florida (2011-present)

Organizations

- Campaign for Working Families
- Club for Growth
- Crow Tribe of Montana
- FreedomWorks
- National Association of Home Builders
- National Right to Life Committee
- NRA Political Victory Fund
- Senate Conservatives Fund
- Susan B. Anthony List
- Tea Party Express
Steve Bullock (D)

Federal officials

- Amy Klobuchar, U.S. senator from Minnesota (2007–present), candidate for 2020 Democratic presidential nomination
- Jon Tester, U.S. senator from Montana (2007–2025), president of the Montana Senate (2005–2007)

Newspapers

- Billings Gazette
- Missoulian
- The Montana Standard

Organizations

- Center for Biological Diversity
- End Citizens United
- Human Rights Campaign
- Jewish Democratic Council of America
- Joint Action Committee for Political Affairs
- League of Conservation Voters
- The Lincoln Project
- Montana State Council of Professional Fire Fighters
- NARAL Pro-Choice America
- National Organization for Women
- Natural Resources Defense Council Action Fund
- Planned Parenthood

Unions

- Communications Workers of America
- Montana AFL-CIO
- Montana Federation of Public Employees
- National Education Association
- United Auto Workers

=== Polling ===
Aggregate polls

Source of poll aggregation	Dates administered	Dates updated	Steve Daines (R)	Steve Bullock (D)	Other/ Undecided (Note: Calculated by taking the difference of 100% and all other candidates combined.)	Margin
270toWin	October 15–19, 2020	November 3, 2020	48.0%	47.2%	4.8%	Daines +0.8%
RealClearPolitics	October 5–24, 2020	November 3, 2020	48.8%	46.4%	4.8%	Daines +2.4%
Average			48.4%	46.8%	4.8%	Daines +1.6%

Poll source	Date(s) administered	Sample size (Note: Key: A – all adults RV – registered voters LV – likely voters V – unclear)	Margin of error	Steve Daines (R)	Steve Bullock (D)	Other	Undecided
Change Research (D)	October 29 – November 2, 2020	920 (LV)	± 3.5%	50%	46%	2% (Note: Did not vote and "Don't recall" with 1%; Would not vote with 0%)	1%
Public Policy Polling (D) (Note: Poll sponsored by Protect Our Care, a pro-Affordable Care Act organization.)	October 26–27, 2020	886 (LV)	± 3.3%	47%	48%	–	6%
The Progress Campaign (D)	October 25, 2020	– (V) (Note: Not yet released)	–	48%	48%	–	–
Montana State University Billings	October 19–24, 2020	546 (LV)	± 4.2%	47%	48%	–	5%
Siena College/NYT Upshot	October 18–20, 2020	758 (LV)	± 4.4%	49%	46%	1% (Note: "Someone else" with 1%; would not vote with 0%)	5%
Strategies 360	October 15–20, 2020	500 (LV)	± 4.4%	48%	47%	–	5%
RMG Research	October 15–18, 2020	800 (LV)	± 3.5%	49% (Note: Standard VI response)	47%	1% (Note: "Some other candidate" with 1%)	4%
RMG Research	October 15–18, 2020	800 (LV)	± 3.5%	47% (Note: Results generated with high Democratic turnout model)	48%	1%	4%
RMG Research	October 15–18, 2020	800 (LV)	± 3.5%	50% (Note: Results generated with high Republican turnout model)	45%	1%	4%
Public Policy Polling (D)	October 9–10, 2020	798 (V)	± 3.5%	48%	48%	–	4%
Emerson College	October 4–7, 2020	500 (LV)	± 3.7%	52%	43%	1% (Note: "Someone else" with 1%)	5%
Data For Progress (D)	September 30 – October 5, 2020	737 (LV)	± 3.6%	47%	48%	0% (Note: Geise (G) with 0%)	4%
Montana State University Bozeman	September 14 – October 2, 2020	1,609 (LV)	± 3.9%	47%	49%	1% (Note: "Other" with 1%)	3%
Siena College/NYT Upshot	September 14–16, 2020	625 (LV)	± 4.8%	45%	44%	5% (Note: Fredrickson (G) with 4%; would not vote with 1%; "someone else" with 0%)	6%
Fabrizio Ward (R)/Hart Research Associates (D) (Note: Poll sponsored by AARP.)	August 30 – September 5, 2020	800 (LV)	± 3.5%	50%	47%	1% (Note: Would not vote with 1%)	2%
Emerson College	July 31 – August 2, 2020	584 (LV)	± 4.0%	50%	44%	1%	5%
Spry Strategies (R) (Note: This poll's sponsor is the American Principles Project, a 501 that supports the Republican Party.)	July 11–16, 2020	700 (LV)	± 3.7%	47%	44%	5% (Note: "Another candidate" with 5%)	4%
Civiqs/Daily Kos	July 11–13, 2020	873 (RV)	± 4.2%	49%	47%	1% (Note: "Someone else" with 1%)	2%
Public Policy Polling (D)	July 9–10, 2020	1,224 (V)	± 2.8%	44%	46%	–	10%
University of Montana	June 17–26, 2020	517 (RV)	± 4.3%	43%	47%	–	10%
Montana State University Bozeman	April 10–27, 2020	459 (LV)	± 4.6%	39%	46%	7% (Note: "someone else" with 6%; would not vote with 1%)	7%
The Progress Campaign (D)	April 14–21, 2020	712 (LV)	± 4.6%	46%	49%	–	5%
Public Policy Polling (D) (Note: Poll sponsored by End Citizens United, an organization which has exclusively supported Democratic candidates.)	March 12–13, 2020	903 (V)	± 3.3%	47%	47%	–	6%

Hypothetical polling

University of Montana polls did not account for certain presumed withdrawals of major party candidates after their primaries in the following polls. Steve Daines vs. Steve Bullock, Wilmot Collins, Mike Knoles, Cora Neumann, and John Mues

Poll source	Date(s) administered	Sample size	Margin of error	Steve Daines (R)	Democratic candidates
University of Montana	February 12–22, 2020	498 (LV)	± 4.4%	47%	53% (Note: Steve Bullock with 38%; Wilmot Collins with 4%; Cora Neumann with 7%; Mike Knoles and John Mues with 2%)

Steve Daines vs. Jack Ballard, Wilmot Collins, and John Mues

Poll source	Date(s) administered	Sample size	Margin of error	Steve Daines (R)	Democratic candidates
University of Montana	September 26 – October 3, 2019	303 (RV)	± 5.6%	64%	36% (Note: Jack Ballard with 18%; Wilmot Collins and John Mues with 9%)

=== Results ===
2020 United States Senate election in Montana
Party	Candidate	Votes	%	±%
Republican	Steve Daines (incumbent)	333,174	55.01%	−2.78%
Democratic	Steve Bullock	272,463	44.99%	+4.92%
Total votes		605,637	100.00%	
Republican hold				

==== By county ====
By county

County	Steve Daines Republican		Steve Bullock Democratic		Margin		Total votes
County	#	%	#	%	#	%	Total votes
Beaverhead	3,775	66.64	1,890	33.36	1,885	33.27	5,665
Big Horn	2,106	43.94	2,687	56.06	-581	-12.12	4,793
Blaine	1,343	42.84	1,792	57.16	-449	-14.32	3,135
Broadwater	3,107	75.60	1,003	24.40	2,104	51.19	4,110
Carbon	4,404	62.96	2,591	37.04	1,813	25.92	6,995
Carter	767	89.08	94	10.92	673	78.16	861
Cascade	22,312	55.73	17,727	44.27	4,585	11.45	40,039
Chouteau	1,813	60.59	1,179	39.41	634	21.19	2,992
Custer	3,995	68.17	1,865	31.83	2,130	36.35	5,860
Daniels	787	76.41	243	23.59	544	52.82	1,030
Dawson	3,634	75.35	1,189	24.65	2,445	50.69	4,823
Deer Lodge	1,921	39.35	2,961	60.65	-1,040	-21.30	4,882
Fallon	1,341	85.09	235	14.91	1,106	70.18	1,576
Fergus	4,746	72.64	1,788	27.36	2,958	45.27	6,534
Flathead	37,861	63.06	22,180	36.94	15,681	26.12	60,041
Gallatin	31,829	44.60	39,540	55.40	-7,711	-10.80	71,369
Garfield	736	90.98	73	9.02	663	81.95	809
Glacier	1,687	29.50	4,032	70.50	-2,345	-41.00	5,719
Golden Valley	405	80.36	99	19.64	306	60.71	504
Granite	1,360	64.73	741	35.27	619	29.46	2,101
Hill	3,746	51.86	3,477	48.14	269	3.72	7,223
Jefferson	5,206	63.70	2,967	36.30	2,239	27.40	8,173
Judith Basin	1,026	76.11	322	23.89	704	52.23	1,348
Lake	8,964	53.91	7,664	46.09	1,300	7.82	16,628
Lewis and Clark	20,554	48.35	21,955	51.65	-1,401	-3.30	42,509
Liberty	789	72.52	299	27.48	490	45.04	1,088
Lincoln	8,490	72.45	3,228	27.55	5,262	44.91	11,718
Madison	4,103	67.06	2,015	32.94	2,088	34.13	6,118
McCone	946	84.24	177	15.76	769	68.48	1,123
Meagher	812	72.63	306	27.37	506	45.26	1,118
Mineral	1,735	68.01	816	31.99	919	36.03	2,551
Missoula	25,529	35.56	46,268	64.44	-20,739	-28.89	71,797
Musselshell	2,341	81.31	538	18.69	1,803	62.63	2,879
Park	5,841	50.32	5,766	49.68	75	0.65	11,607
Petroleum	300	85.47	51	14.53	249	70.94	351
Phillips	1,895	79.69	483	20.31	1,412	59.38	2,378
Pondera	1,933	64.33	1,072	35.67	861	28.65	3,005
Powder River	957	84.17	180	15.83	777	68.34	1,137
Powell	2,240	70.53	936	29.47	1,304	41.06	3,176
Prairie	586	78.45	161	21.55	425	56.89	747
Ravalli	18,706	65.47	9,868	34.53	8,838	30.93	28,574
Richland	4,669	80.63	1,122	19.37	3,547	61.25	5,791
Roosevelt	1,891	46.89	2,142	53.11	-251	-6.22	4,033
Rosebud	2,436	64.55	1,338	35.45	1,098	29.09	3,774
Sanders	5,395	71.12	2,191	28.88	3,204	42.24	7,586
Sheridan	1,356	67.00	668	33.00	688	33.99	2,024
Silver Bow	6,641	35.28	12,183	64.72	-5,542	-29.44	18,824
Stillwater	4,370	76.08	1,374	23.92	2,996	52.16	5,744
Sweet Grass	1,834	74.58	625	25.42	1,209	49.17	2,459
Teton	2,541	68.56	1,165	31.44	1,376	37.13	3,706
Toole	1,528	71.97	595	28.03	933	43.95	2,123
Treasure	376	81.03	88	18.97	288	62.07	464
Valley	2,953	69.34	1,306	30.66	1,647	38.67	4,259
Wheatland	789	74.50	270	25.50	519	49.01	1,059
Wibaux	491	82.38	105	17.62	386	64.77	596
Yellowstone	49,276	58.59	34,833	41.41	14,443	17.17	84,109
Totals	333,174	55.01	272,463	44.99	60,711	10.02	605,637

Counties that flipped from Republican to Democratic

- Gallatin (largest municipality: Bozeman)
- Lewis and Clark (largest municipality: Helena)
- Roosevelt (largest municipality: Wolf Point)

== Notes ==
Partisan clients
