= Roosevelt County, Montana =

County in Montana, United States

- County
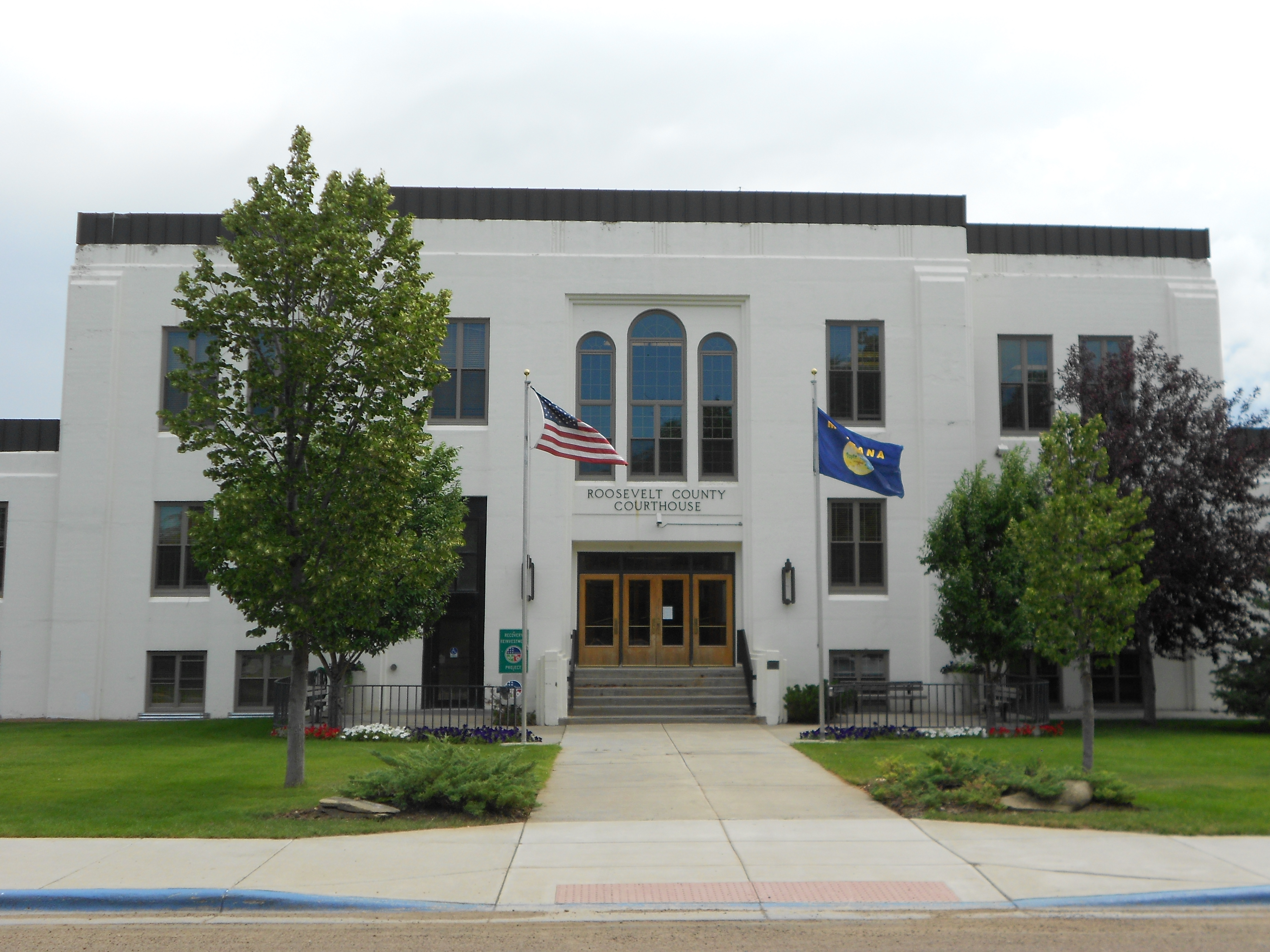
- Roosevelt County Courthouse in Wolf Point

- Location within the U.S. state of Montana
- Coordinates: 48°18′N 105°02′W
- Country: United States
- State: Montana
- Founded: 1919
- Named for: Theodore Roosevelt
- Seat: Wolf Point
- Largest city: Wolf Point

Area
  - Total: 2,369 sq mi (6,140 km^{2})
  - Land: 2,355 sq mi (6,100 km^{2})
  - Water: 15 sq mi (39 km^{2}) 0.6%

Population (2020)
  - Total: 10,794
  - Estimate (2025): 10,242 ▼
  - Density: 4.583/sq mi (1.770/km^{2})
- Time zone: UTC−7 (Mountain)
  - Summer (DST): UTC−6 (MDT)
- Congressional district: 2nd
- Website: www.rooseveltcountymt.gov
- Montana county number 17

Roosevelt County is a county in the U.S. state of Montana. As of the 2020 census, the population was 10,794. Its county seat is Wolf Point. Roosevelt County was created by the Montana Legislature in 1919 from a portion of Sheridan County. The name honors former U.S. President Theodore Roosevelt, who had died earlier that year.

== Geography ==
According to the United States Census Bureau, the county has a total area of 2,369 square miles (6,140 km^{2}), of which 2,355 square miles (6,100 km^{2}) is land and 15 square miles (39 km^{2}) (0.6%) is water. Three-fourths of the county's land area lies within the Fort Peck Indian Reservation.

=== Major highways ===
- U.S. Route 2
- Montana Highway 13
- Montana Highway 16
- Montana Highway 25
- Montana Highway 251

=== Transit ===
- Amtrak Empire Builder (Wolf Point station)

=== Adjacent counties ===
- Daniels County – northwest
- Sheridan County – northeast
- Williams County, North Dakota – east
- McKenzie County, North Dakota – southeast
- Richland County – south
- McCone County – southwest
- Valley County - west

=== National protected areas ===
- Fort Union Trading Post National Historic Site (part)
- Medicine Lake National Wildlife Refuge (part)

=== Climate ===
According to the Köppen Climate Classification system, Bredette has a cold semi-arid climate, abbreviated "BSk" on climate maps. The hottest temperature recorded in Bredette was 108 °F (42.2 °C) on August 6, 1983, and July 24, 2007, while the coldest temperature recorded was −52 °F (−46.7 °C) on January 20, 1954.

Climate data for Bredette, Montana, 1991–2020 normals, extremes 1950–present
Month	Jan	Feb	Mar	Apr	May	Jun	Jul	Aug	Sep	Oct	Nov	Dec	Year
Record high °F (°C)	57 (14)	65 (18)	76 (24)	91 (33)	100 (38)	107 (42)	108 (42)	108 (42)	103 (39)	95 (35)	76 (24)	59 (15)	108 (42)
Mean maximum °F (°C)	45.3 (7.4)	46.0 (7.8)	63.0 (17.2)	77.2 (25.1)	85.4 (29.7)	90.9 (32.7)	96.0 (35.6)	97.6 (36.4)	92.6 (33.7)	78.9 (26.1)	61.4 (16.3)	45.9 (7.7)	99.6 (37.6)
Mean daily maximum °F (°C)	22.3 (−5.4)	26.3 (−3.2)	39.1 (3.9)	54.9 (12.7)	66.7 (19.3)	74.8 (23.8)	82.4 (28.0)	82.9 (28.3)	71.7 (22.1)	54.9 (12.7)	37.6 (3.1)	25.6 (−3.6)	53.3 (11.8)
Daily mean °F (°C)	12.3 (−10.9)	16.0 (−8.9)	28.0 (−2.2)	41.7 (5.4)	52.9 (11.6)	61.5 (16.4)	67.9 (19.9)	67.5 (19.7)	57.2 (14.0)	42.5 (5.8)	27.3 (−2.6)	16.0 (−8.9)	40.9 (4.9)
Mean daily minimum °F (°C)	2.4 (−16.4)	5.7 (−14.6)	17.0 (−8.3)	28.5 (−1.9)	39.1 (3.9)	48.3 (9.1)	53.5 (11.9)	52.1 (11.2)	42.8 (6.0)	30.1 (−1.1)	17.0 (−8.3)	6.4 (−14.2)	28.6 (−1.9)
Mean minimum °F (°C)	−23.3 (−30.7)	−17.3 (−27.4)	−5.4 (−20.8)	13.3 (−10.4)	25.6 (−3.6)	38.3 (3.5)	44.5 (6.9)	40.8 (4.9)	27.8 (−2.3)	12.2 (−11.0)	−4.3 (−20.2)	−17.6 (−27.6)	−28.1 (−33.4)
Record low °F (°C)	−52 (−47)	−48 (−44)	−34 (−37)	−12 (−24)	8 (−13)	26 (−3)	35 (2)	29 (−2)	10 (−12)	−7 (−22)	−24 (−31)	−39 (−39)	−52 (−47)
Average precipitation inches (mm)	0.39 (9.9)	0.26 (6.6)	0.50 (13)	0.97 (25)	2.09 (53)	3.38 (86)	2.68 (68)	1.32 (34)	1.02 (26)	0.92 (23)	0.49 (12)	0.39 (9.9)	14.41 (366.4)
Average snowfall inches (cm)	5.6 (14)	3.6 (9.1)	3.9 (9.9)	2.3 (5.8)	0.8 (2.0)	0.0 (0.0)	0.0 (0.0)	0.0 (0.0)	0.0 (0.0)	2.2 (5.6)	4.3 (11)	5.5 (14)	28.2 (71.4)
Average precipitation days (≥ 0.01 in)	6.4	5.3	5.9	8.0	9.8	12.3	9.8	7.2	7.3	7.2	6.3	5.9	91.4
Average snowy days (≥ 0.1 in)	6.7	5.2	4.8	2.3	0.5	0.0	0.0	0.0	0.0	1.7	5.1	6.4	32.7
Source 1: NOAA
Source 2: National Weather Service

== Demographics ==
Historical population
Census	Pop.	Note	%±
1920	10,347		—
1930	10,672		3.1%
1940	9,806		−8.1%
1950	9,580		−2.3%
1960	11,731		22.5%
1970	10,365		−11.6%
1980	10,467		1.0%
1990	10,999		5.1%
2000	10,620		−3.4%
2010	10,425		−1.8%
2020	10,794		3.5%
2025 (est.)	10,242	▼	−5.1%
U.S. Decennial Census; 1790–1960, 1900–1990, 1990–2000, 2010–2020

=== 2020 census ===
As of the 2020 census, the county had a population of 10,794. Of the residents, 30.9% were under the age of 18 and 13.8% were 65 years of age or older; the median age was 33.2 years. For every 100 females there were 99.5 males, and for every 100 females age 18 and over there were 96.5 males. 0.0% of residents lived in urban areas and 100.0% lived in rural areas.

The racial makeup of the county was 33.6% White, 0.3% Black or African American, 57.9% American Indian and Alaska Native, 0.4% Asian, 0.6% from some other race, and 7.2% from two or more races. Hispanic or Latino residents of any race comprised 2.2% of the population.

There were 3,610 households in the county, of which 40.2% had children under the age of 18 living with them and 30.4% had a female householder with no spouse or partner present. About 26.4% of all households were made up of individuals and 9.7% had someone living alone who was 65 years of age or older.

There were 4,065 housing units, of which 11.2% were vacant. Among occupied housing units, 59.9% were owner-occupied and 40.1% were renter-occupied. The homeowner vacancy rate was 2.0% and the rental vacancy rate was 7.4%.

=== 2010 census ===
As of the 2010 census, there were 10,425 people, 3,553 households, and 2,548 families residing in the county. The population density was 4.4 inhabitants per square mile (1.7/km^{2}). There were 4,063 housing units at an average density of 1.7 per square mile (0.66/km^{2}). The racial makeup of the county was 60.4% American Indian, 35.8% white, 0.4% Asian, 0.1% black or African American, 0.2% from other races, and 3.0% from two or more races. Those of Hispanic or Latino origin made up 1.3% of the population. In terms of ancestry, 20.0% were Norwegian, 16.3% were German, 6.1% were Irish, and 1.3% were American.

Of the 3,553 households, 42.4% had children under the age of 18 living with them, 42.9% were married couples living together, 20.5% had a female householder with no husband present, 28.3% were non-families, and 24.2% of all households were made up of individuals. The average household size was 2.88 and the average family size was 3.41. The median age was 31.6 years.

The median income for a household in the county was $37,451 and the median income for a family was $50,146. Males had a median income of $39,008 versus $34,725 for females. The per capita income for the county was $17,821. About 15.8% of families and 21.5% of the population were below the poverty line, including 28.6% of those under age 18 and 10.9% of those age 65 or over.

== Politics ==
Roosevelt County is competitive in presidential elections, due to its high Native American population. After a seven-election streak of voting for the Democratic candidate, it voted for Republican Donald Trump by narrow margins in 2016 and 2020. In 2024, the county trended more strongly in the conservative direction when it gave Trump a 53% majority.

United States presidential election results for Roosevelt County, Montana
Year	Republican		Democratic		Third party(ies)	
Year	No.	%	No.	%	No.	%
1920	1,624	71.26%	555	24.35%	100	4.39%
1924	965	39.10%	389	15.76%	1,114	45.14%
1928	1,630	55.27%	1,296	43.95%	23	0.78%
1932	965	27.57%	2,263	64.66%	272	7.77%
1936	1,052	25.60%	2,923	71.14%	134	3.26%
1940	1,503	37.74%	2,418	60.72%	61	1.53%
1944	1,281	40.44%	1,848	58.33%	39	1.23%
1948	1,142	36.51%	1,820	58.18%	166	5.31%
1952	1,998	57.36%	1,466	42.09%	19	0.55%
1956	1,985	47.37%	2,205	52.63%	0	0.00%
1960	1,876	45.40%	2,227	53.90%	29	0.70%
1964	1,612	39.53%	2,463	60.40%	3	0.07%
1968	1,947	50.12%	1,771	45.59%	167	4.30%
1972	2,304	58.97%	1,464	37.47%	139	3.56%
1976	1,822	46.38%	2,061	52.47%	45	1.15%
1980	2,298	55.24%	1,504	36.15%	358	8.61%
1984	2,431	54.46%	1,962	43.95%	71	1.59%
1988	1,957	47.52%	2,083	50.58%	78	1.89%
1992	1,212	28.91%	1,827	43.57%	1,154	27.52%
1996	1,209	30.25%	2,118	52.99%	670	16.76%
2000	1,605	42.09%	2,059	54.00%	149	3.91%
2004	1,762	43.74%	2,195	54.49%	71	1.76%
2008	1,473	35.47%	2,564	61.74%	116	2.79%
2012	1,514	41.23%	2,086	56.81%	72	1.96%
2016	1,797	49.21%	1,560	42.72%	295	8.08%
2020	1,996	49.69%	1,910	47.55%	111	2.76%
2024	2,055	52.50%	1,680	42.92%	179	4.57%

== Communities ==
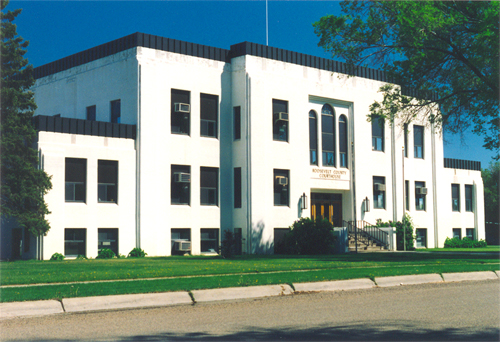
Roosevelt County Courthouse, Wolf Point MT

=== Cities ===
- Poplar
- Wolf Point (county seat)

=== Towns ===
- Bainville
- Culbertson
- Froid

=== Census-designated place ===
- Brockton

=== Unincorporated communities ===
- Biem
- Blair
- Bredette
- Chelsea
- Fort Kipp
- Macon
- Sprole

== See also ==
- List of lakes in Roosevelt County, Montana
- List of mountains in Roosevelt County, Montana
- National Register of Historic Places listings in Roosevelt County MT
