= Rick Jore =

American politician (born 1956)

Member of the Montana House of Representatives
- In office January 3, 2007 – January 3, 2009
- Preceded by: Jeanne Windham
- Succeeded by: John Fleming
- Constituency: 73rd district
- In office 1995–2001
- Succeeded by: Joey Jayne
- Constituency: 12th district

Personal details
- Born: December 21, 1956 (age 69) Ronan, Montana, U.S.
- Party: Constitution (2000–present); Republican (1994–2000)
- Children: 5
- Education: North Idaho College (AS)

Rick Jore (born December 21, 1956) is an American politician and businessman who served as a member of the Montana House of Representatives from 1995 to 2001 and 2007 to 2009.

== Early life and education ==
Jore was born and raised in Ronan, Montana, and received his associate degree from North Idaho College in 1978.

== Career ==
He is also the owner of Westslope Trout Company and the vice chairman of the Constitution Party of Montana. Jore spent 10 years working in a lumber mill.

First elected as a Republican in 1994, Jore served three terms in the Montana House of Representatives before switching his affiliation to the Constitution Party in March 2000. Jore ran again for the legislature in 2000 and 2002 as a Constitution Party candidate and was narrowly defeated in both attempts. A very narrow defeat in 2004, after a recount, was followed by a successful run in 2006, defeating his Democratic opponent 2,045 to 1,643 votes.

=== 2004 election ===
In the very close 2004 election, following a recount, Jore initially tied with Democratic nominee Jeanne Windham, with each receiving 1,559 votes (Republican Jack Cross received 1,107 votes) in state House District 12.

Because there was a tie, under Montana law the outgoing Republican Governor Judy Martz, was entitled to choose the winner, and she selected Jore—which gave the Republicans a 50-49 lead over Democrats in the state House, with Jore as the only Constitution Party member.

The matter went to the state courts, and in December 2004, the Montana Supreme Court issued its initial ruling, finding in a 6-1 decision that "one or more" of seven contested ballots for Jore were invalid. The decision meant that Windham was elected to office, which in turn created a tie in the state House, which was evenly split (50-50) between Republicans and Democrats in the House. Because the incoming governor, Brian Schweitzer, was a Democrat, this meant that the new state House speaker would be a Democrat. The Court's written opinion was issued March 18, 2005.

=== 2006 election ===
In the next election, Jore had a rematch with Jeanne Windham. This time, Jore won with 55.4% of the vote. With Republicans controlling the Montana House by a slim margin of 50-49, Jore obtained an unexpected amount of political leverage and was appointed chairman of the House Education Committee.

=== 2008 election ===
Since Jore had already served in the Montana House as a Republican before his 2006 election as a member of the Constitution Party of Montana, state term-limit laws barred him from running for the Montana House in 2008. He attempted to qualify an initiative for the ballot, called the Personhood Amendment, but failed to gather enough signatures.

== Political positions ==
Jore has been described as a "no-compromise conservative" and as one of the most conservative legislators in Montana. Jore supports an "original intent" approach to interpreting the U.S. Constitution, stating that "The concept of a living constitution is in my mind an absolute perversion."

Jore has authored bills that call for eliminating state laws requiring compulsory school attendance, outlawing affirmative action and abandoning Montana's no-fault divorce laws by requiring a judge to publicly declare who is to blame for the breakup and imposing a financial penalty. Other bills that Jore has authored would end the state inheritance tax, phase in a 20 percent reduction in individual income taxes, terminate the state-tribal hunting and fishing agreement on the Flathead Indian Reservation, and a right-to-work state by prohibiting payment of union dues as a condition of employment.

== Personal life ==
He and his wife homeschooled their five children.

== Electoral history ==
1994 Montana House of Representatives District 73
Party	Candidate	Votes	%
Republican	Rick Jore	1,707	54.8%
Democratic	Ervin Davis	1,406	45.2%

2000 Montana House of Representatives District 73
Party	Candidate	Votes	%
Democratic	Joey Jane	1,872	50.7%
Constitution	Rick Jore (incumbent)	1,818	49.3%

2002 Montana House of Representatives District 73
Party	Candidate	Votes	%
Democratic	Joey Jane (incumbent)	1,539	49.3%
Constitution	Rick Jore	1,339	42.9%
Republican	Josh D. King	245	7.9%

2004 Montana House of Representatives District 12
Party	Candidate	Votes	%
Democratic	Jeanne Windham	1,559	36.9%
Constitution	Rick Jore	1,559	36.9%
Republican	Jack Cross	1,107	26.2%

2006 Montana House of Representatives District 12
Party	Candidate	Votes	%
Constitution	Rick Jore	2,045	55.5%
Democratic	Jeanne Windham (incumbent)	1,643	44.6%
