= Jeanne Windham =

American politician

Jeanne Windham is an American psychologist and mediator from Polson, Montana who served one term as a Democratic member of the Montana House of Representatives.

She was unseated in 2006 by Rick Jore of the Constitution Party, whom she had defeated in 2004 when the Montana Supreme Court ruled that seven ballots which had been punched for two candidates could not be counted as votes for Jore, thus breaking a tie (and giving control of the House to the Democratic Party).
