= 2004 United States presidential election in Montana =

- November 2, 2004
- Turnout: 71.4% (▲11.5 pp)

Nominee	George W. Bush	John Kerry
Party	Republican	Democratic
Home state	Texas	Massachusetts
Running mate	Dick Cheney	John Edwards
Electoral vote	3	0
Popular vote	266,063	173,710
Percentage	59.07%	38.56%
County results
Bush
50–60%
60–70%
70–80%
80–90%
90–100%
Kerry
50–60%
President before election
George W. Bush
Republican
Elected President
George W. Bush
Republican

The 2004 United States presidential election in Montana took place on November 2, 2004, and was part of the 2004 United States presidential election. Voters chose three representatives, or electors, to the Electoral College, who voted for president and vice president.

Montana was won by incumbent President George W. Bush by a 20.5% margin of victory. Prior to the election, all 12 news organizations considered this a state Bush would win, or considered as a safe red state.

== Primaries ==
- 2004 Montana Democratic presidential primary

== Campaign ==
=== Predictions ===
There were 12 news organizations who made state-by-state predictions of the election. Here are their last predictions before election day.

Source	Ranking
D.C. Political Report	Solid R
Cook Political Report	Solid R
Research 2000	Solid R
Zogby International	Likely R
Washington Post	Likely R
Washington Dispatch	Likely R
Washington Times	Solid R
The New York Times	Solid R
CNN	Likely R
Newsweek	Solid R
Associated Press	Solid R
Rasmussen Reports	Likely R

=== Polling ===
Only a few pre-election polls were taken here. Bush won each one of them with a double-digit margin and with at least 54% of the vote. The final three polling averages showed him leading 55% to 35%.

=== Fundraising ===
Bush raised $385,635. Kerry raised $145,679.

=== Advertising and visits ===
Neither campaign advertised or visited this state during the fall campaign.

== Analysis ==
Bush's key to victory was winning the highly populated Yellowstone County with 60% along with the majority of other counties. Kerry only won six counties in the state, including swinging Missoula County and his best performance in the Democratic stronghold of Deer Lodge County.

== Results ==
2004 United States presidential election in Montana
Party	Candidate	Votes	Percentage	Electoral votes
Republican	George W. Bush (incumbent)	266,063	59.07%	3
Democratic	John Kerry	173,710	38.56%	0
Independent	Ralph Nader	6,168	1.37%	0
Constitution	Michael Peroutka	1,764	0.39%	0
Libertarian	Michael Badnarik	1,733	0.38%	0
Green	David Cobb	996	0.22%	0
Write Ins.	-	11	0.00%	0
Totals		450,445	100.00%	6
Voter turnout (voting age population)				64.2%

=== By county ===
County	George W. Bush Republican		John Kerry Democratic		Various candidates Other parties		Margin		Total
County	#	%	#	%	#	%	#	%	Total
Beaverhead	3,067	72.30%	1,103	26.00%	72	1.70%	1,964	46.30%	4,242
Big Horn	2,028	47.04%	2,215	51.38%	68	1.58%	-187	-4.34%	4,311
Blaine	1,424	51.45%	1,300	46.97%	44	1.59%	124	4.48%	2,768
Broadwater	1,778	75.47%	533	22.62%	45	1.90%	1,245	52.85%	2,356
Carbon	3,342	62.81%	1,847	34.71%	132	2.48%	1,495	28.10%	5,321
Carter	623	87.87%	76	10.72%	10	1.41%	547	77.15%	709
Cascade	19,028	56.87%	13,701	40.95%	730	2.18%	5,327	15.92%	33,459
Chouteau	1,913	65.49%	946	32.39%	62	2.12%	967	33.10%	2,921
Custer	3,297	65.31%	1,630	32.29%	121	2.40%	1,667	33.02%	5,048
Daniels	764	68.28%	326	29.13%	29	2.59%	438	39.15%	1,119
Dawson	2,884	64.32%	1,494	33.32%	106	2.36%	1,390	31.00%	4,484
Deer Lodge	1,725	37.97%	2,700	59.43%	118	2.60%	-975	-21.46%	4,543
Fallon	1,178	79.01%	289	19.38%	24	1.61%	889	59.63%	1,491
Fergus	4,425	72.22%	1,582	25.82%	120	1.96%	2,843	46.40%	6,127
Flathead	26,019	67.27%	11,587	29.96%	1,072	2.77%	14,432	37.31%	38,678
Gallatin	22,392	56.20%	16,405	41.18%	1,045	2.62%	5,987	15.02%	39,842
Garfield	590	90.08%	52	7.94%	13	1.98%	538	82.14%	655
Glacier	1,828	40.07%	2,641	57.89%	93	2.04%	-813	-17.82%	4,562
Golden Valley	396	75.86%	119	22.80%	7	1.34%	277	53.06%	522
Granite	1,144	71.28%	404	25.17%	57	3.55%	740	46.11%	1,605
Hill	3,505	52.65%	2,997	45.02%	155	2.33%	508	7.63%	6,657
Jefferson	3,844	65.51%	1,881	32.06%	143	2.44%	1,963	33.45%	5,868
Judith Basin	944	73.41%	322	25.04%	20	1.56%	622	48.37%	1,286
Lake	7,245	57.61%	4,960	39.44%	371	2.95%	2,285	18.17%	12,576
Lewis and Clark	16,494	55.27%	12,717	42.61%	632	2.12%	3,777	12.66%	29,843
Liberty	734	71.06%	281	27.20%	18	1.74%	453	43.86%	1,033
Lincoln	5,889	69.70%	2,320	27.46%	240	2.84%	3,569	42.24%	8,449
Madison	2,868	72.92%	983	24.99%	82	2.08%	1,885	47.93%	3,933
McCone	791	69.57%	320	28.14%	26	2.29%	471	41.43%	1,137
Meagher	698	71.74%	247	25.39%	28	2.88%	451	46.35%	973
Mineral	1,242	67.61%	542	29.50%	53	2.89%	700	38.11%	1,837
Missoula	23,989	45.73%	26,983	51.44%	1,482	2.83%	-2,994	-5.71%	52,454
Musselshell	1,663	74.01%	538	23.94%	46	2.05%	1,125	50.07%	2,247
Park	4,771	58.06%	3,199	38.93%	248	3.02%	1,572	19.13%	8,218
Petroleum	228	78.08%	55	18.84%	9	3.08%	173	59.24%	292
Phillips	1,677	77.28%	456	21.01%	37	1.71%	1,221	56.27%	2,170
Pondera	1,853	64.79%	956	33.43%	51	1.78%	897	31.36%	2,860
Powder River	856	83.19%	154	14.97%	19	1.85%	702	68.22%	1,029
Powell	1,993	70.42%	761	26.89%	76	2.69%	1,232	43.53%	2,830
Prairie	546	74.18%	181	24.59%	9	1.22%	365	49.59%	736
Ravalli	13,279	66.84%	6,144	30.93%	444	2.23%	7,135	35.91%	19,867
Richland	3,110	72.19%	1,120	26.00%	78	1.81%	1,990	46.19%	4,308
Roosevelt	1,762	43.74%	2,195	54.49%	71	1.76%	-433	-10.75%	4,028
Rosebud	1,982	55.29%	1,520	42.40%	83	2.32%	462	12.89%	3,585
Sanders	3,461	67.16%	1,502	29.15%	190	3.69%	1,959	38.01%	5,153
Sheridan	1,159	56.87%	846	41.51%	33	1.62%	313	15.36%	2,038
Silver Bow	6,381	39.67%	9,307	57.86%	396	2.46%	-2,926	-18.19%	16,084
Stillwater	3,090	73.34%	1,025	24.33%	98	2.33%	2,065	49.01%	4,213
Sweet Grass	1,509	76.10%	445	22.44%	29	1.46%	1,064	53.66%	1,983
Teton	2,232	66.45%	1,047	31.17%	80	2.38%	1,185	35.28%	3,359
Toole	1,583	68.50%	690	29.86%	38	1.64%	893	38.64%	2,311
Treasure	348	72.20%	121	25.10%	13	2.70%	227	47.10%	482
Valley	2,476	61.62%	1,431	35.61%	111	2.76%	1,045	26.01%	4,018
Wheatland	706	72.11%	250	25.54%	23	2.35%	456	46.57%	979
Wibaux	407	72.68%	144	25.71%	9	1.61%	263	46.97%	560
Yellowstone	40,903	61.71%	24,120	36.39%	1,263	1.90%	16,783	25.32%	66,286
Totals	266,063	59.07%	173,710	38.56%	10,672	2.37%	92,353	20.51%	450,445

==== Counties that flipped from Republican to Democratic ====
- Missoula (largest city: Missoula)

=== By congressional district ===
Due to the state's low population, only one congressional district is allocated. This district is called the at-large district, because it covers the entire state, and thus is equivalent to the statewide election results.

District	Bush	Kerry	Representative
At-large	59.1%	38.6%	Denny Rehberg

== Electors ==
Technically the voters of Montana cast their ballots for electors: representatives to the Electoral College. Montana is allocated three electors because it has one congressional districts and two senators. All candidates who appear on the ballot or qualify to receive write-in votes must submit a list of three electors, who pledge to vote for their candidate and their running mate. Whoever wins the majority of votes in the state is awarded all three electoral votes. Their chosen electors then vote for president and vice president. Although electors are pledged to their candidate and running mate, they are not obligated to vote for them. An elector who votes for someone other than their candidate is known as a faithless elector.

The electors of each state and the District of Columbia met on December 13, 2004, to cast their votes for president and vice president. The Electoral College itself never meets as one body. Instead, the electors from each state and the District of Columbia met in their respective capitols.

The following were the members of the Electoral College from the state. All three were pledged for Bush/Cheney.

1. Jack Galt
2. Thelma Baker
3. John Brenden

== See also ==
- United States presidential elections in Montana
- Presidency of George W. Bush
