= Green Party of Montana =

Montana affiliate of the Green Party

Montana Green Party
- Ideology: Green politics
- Political position: Left-wing
- National affiliation: Green Party of the United States
- Colors: Green
- Seats in the U.S. Senate: 0 / 2
- Seats in the U.S. House: 0 / 2
- Montana Senate: 0 / 50
- Montana House of Representatives: 0 / 100
- Other elected officials: 0 (February 2024)

The Montana Green Party is a state-level political party affiliated with the Green Party of the United States. It formed in 2001–2002 following Ralph Nader's run for president in 2000 as the Green Party nominee.

The party has run candidates for president, governor, lieutenant governor, US Senate, and the Montana legislature. It earned ballot access for the national party's presidential candidates in 2004 and 2016.

In 2020, a controversy arose regarding the party's ballot eligibility, after it was revealed that the state Republican Party had financed efforts to collect the required signatures and some voters who had signed the petitions asked to revoke their signatures. Following a series of legal cases, a US District judge ruled, and the state Supreme Court concurred, that the voters were entitled to revoke their signatures, and that as a result the Green Party had insufficient signatures to appear on the 2020 ballot.

== Electoral history ==
=== 2002 election ===
In 2002, Bob Kelleher ran for U.S. Senate as the Green Party nominee and received 2.3% of the vote.

=== 2004 election ===
In Montana's 2004 elections, the party attained ballot access for David Cobb, that year's presidential nominee, as well as Kelleher, who that year was the party's gubernatorial nominee. Cobb received under 1,000 votes, while Kelleher received more than 8,000, and placed third in the gubernatorial election. Following that election, the state party became inactive and was not reaccredited by the GPUS until 2007.

=== 2008 election ===
The MTGP held its 2008 convention in Missoula. However, the party's presidential nominee, Cynthia McKinney, did not get on Montana's ballot for the general election.

=== 2016 election ===
In 2016, the party filed more than three times the minimum required number of signatures to place party nominee Jill Stein on the ballot. Many of their supporters were former supporters of U.S. Senator and presidential candidate Bernie Sanders.

The Green Party of Montana was considered a recognized party committee as of the 2016 election cycle.

=== 2020 election ===
==== Petition controversy ====
In May 2020, the Montana Green Party revealed that petitions to benefit Green candidate Wendie Fredrickson in Montana were being circulated by a political action committee, named Go Green Montana but not affiliated with the state party, and apparently backed by a conservative group which hoped to split left-leaning voters. The state party emphasized that they had repeatedly reached out to the organization, but had received no response.

In May 2020, after the Greens had initially secured ballot access, it was also reported that the state Republican Party paid $100,000 to finance the effort to collect the petition signatures necessary to qualify the Green Party for ballot access in the state. The Republican Party was also accused of violating campaign finance laws by failing to disclose the funding of the petition drive. The Green Party of Montana acknowledged that it had not played a role in the signature collection. Some commentators speculated that the presence of the Green Party on the ballot had the potential to hinder Democratic candidates, particularly in the elections for Senate and the at-large House seat, both of which were expected to be competitive races.

Following the revelation that the Republican Party had funded the signature collection, more than 560 voters out of the 13,000 who had signed the petitions asked to have their signatures removed, as they hadn't realized that the GOP was involved in the effort. The communications manager of the national Green Party alleged that some of the voters asking to withdraw their signatures had been subjected to pressure to do so. Montana Secretary of State Corey Stapleton, a Republican, argued that the signers had missed a deadline to withdraw their names, and that there wasn't an established procedure for withdrawing a petition signature.

==== Legal challenges ====
In response to Stapleton's refusal to invalidate the signatures by voters who had changed their minds, four of the petition signers and the Democratic Party of Montana jointly filed a suit in court. James Reynolds, a US District Judge, ruled that no deadline like the one which Stapleton cited existed, and that with those signatures voided, the Party no longer qualified for the ballot. The case marked the second time in two years that Reynolds had issued a ruling removing the Green Party from the Montana ballot: in 2018, he had ruled that the Party be removed from the ballot in response to discrepancies regarding petition signatures.

Upon Reynolds's ruling, two voters and two Green Party candidates (for state Senate and Attorney General) filed suit in a US District Court, arguing that their rights, and votes in the Green Party primary, were violated by his ruling. However, judge Dana Christensen ruled against them, citing the fact that the parallel case was still in the courts.

Stapleton appealed Reynolds's ruling to the state Supreme Court. Reynolds's judgment was upheld on August 19, 2020, in a 5-2 ruling. The Court, in addition to Reynolds's reasoning, noted that the general election ballot had to be certified by August 20. Stapleton announced his intention to appeal the case to the United States Supreme Court. On August 25, 2020, the Supreme Court declined to take up the case. Justice Elena Kagan declined on the court's behalf; she issued the decision without a comment or dissent. This made it unlikely that the party would appear on the ballot, since Montana law required absentee ballots to be sent to members of the military by September 15. By September 18, ballots had been mailed to overseas voters, ensuring that the Green Party would not be on the ballot in the 2020 election.

==== Aftermath ====
Steve Daines, the incumbent Republican, prevailed in the US Senate race by a margin of ten percentage points in spite of predictions that the Green Party's absence from the ballot would bolster Democrats. In April 2021, the Montana state legislature considered a bill that would make it easier for third parties to attain ballot access, by making petition signature matching requirements more lenient, barring signers from revoking their signatures after the petition deadline, and allowing anyone, irrespective of party registration, to collect signatures for third parties' petitions. The bill did not mention the Green Party specifically, but it was widely understood that its drafting and consideration was in response to the previous year's episode and the similar issue in 2018. The Montana House passed the bill in a party-line vote, with all Republicans supporting it and all Democrats opposing it. The Green Party still opposed portions of the bill, however, including a provision which required different numbers of signatures to be collected in different state legislative districts; they mounted a legal challenge to this provision in the federal Ninth Circuit Court.

=== 2022 ===
In 2022, the Montana Secretary of State signed a settlement with the Green Party of Montana agreeing to recognize the party for the 2022 election.

== Related ==
- Montana Libertarian Party
- Political party strength in Montana
