= Montana Libertarian Party =

State affiliate of the Libertarian Party

- Chairperson: Melissa Wong
- Founded: 1979
- Headquarters: Kalispell, MT
- Ideology: Libertarianism
- National affiliation: Libertarian Party
- Colors: a shade of blue; yellow
- Seats in the Montana Senate: 0 / 50
- Seats in the Montana House: 0 / 100
- MT seats in the U.S. Senate: 0 / 2
- MT seats in the U.S. House: 0 / 2
- Other elected officials: 0 (June 2024)

Website
- www.mtlp.org

The Montana Libertarian Party is the Montana affiliate of the Libertarian Party. In 2012, Mike Fellows made history by becoming the first Libertarian in national Libertarian Party history to achieve 40 percent in a partisan statewide race. In recent years, the party has emphasized issue-coalitions. In 2024, Montana Libertarian Party members attended a Donald Trump rally in Bozeman, Montana, where they met with President Donald Trump and convinced Senator Tim Sheehy to support the 'Defend the Guard' Act. They also praised Representative Matt Rosendale for co-sponsoring legislation to end the Federal Reserve.

== Chairs ==
- Larry Dodge
- Mike Fellows (until 2016)
- Ron Vandevender (2016–2017)
- Elinor Swanson (2017)
- Michael Fucci (2017–2018)
- Francis Wendt (2018–2019)
- Sid Daoud (2019–2024)
- Melissa Wong (2025-present) - interim chair filling in for the remaining term of Sid Daoud then re-elected September 2025

== See also ==
- Montana Democratic Party
- Montana Republican Party
- Green Party of Montana
- Don Doig
