= Geography of Montana =

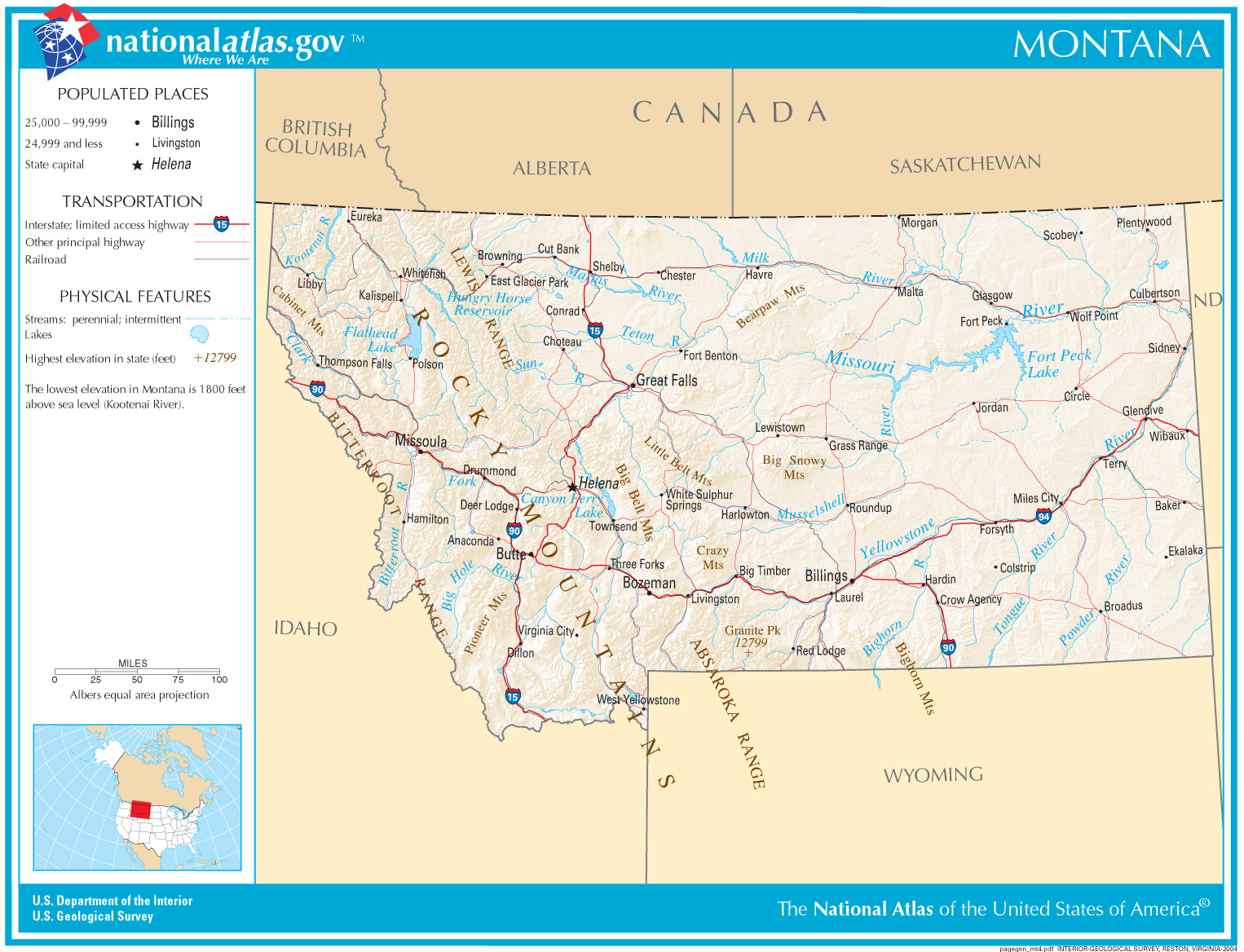
Map of Montana

Montana is one of the eight Mountain States, located in the north of the region known as the Western United States. It borders North Dakota and South Dakota to the east. Wyoming is to the south, Idaho is to the west and southwest, and the Canadian provinces of British Columbia, Alberta, and Saskatchewan are to the north, making it the only state to border three Canadian provinces.

With an area of 147,040 square miles (380,800 km^{2}), Montana is slightly larger than Japan. It is the fourth-largest state in the United States after Alaska, Texas, and California, and the largest landlocked state.

== Topography ==
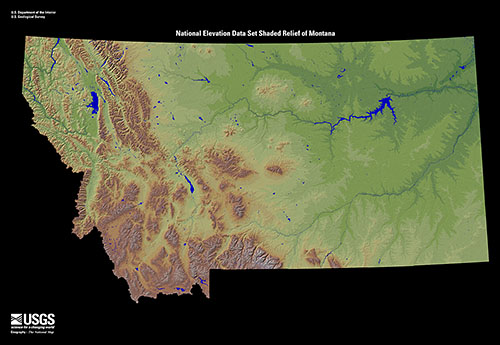
Relief map of Montana

The state's topography is roughly defined by the Continental Divide, which splits much of the state into distinct eastern and western regions. Most of Montana's hundred or more named mountain ranges are in the state's western half, most of which is geologically and geographically part of the northern Rocky Mountains. The Absaroka and Beartooth ranges in the state's south-central part are technically part of the Central Rocky Mountains. The Rocky Mountain Front is a significant feature in the state's north-central portion, and isolated island ranges that interrupt the prairie landscape common in the central and eastern parts of the state. About 60 percent of the state is prairie, part of the northern Great Plains.

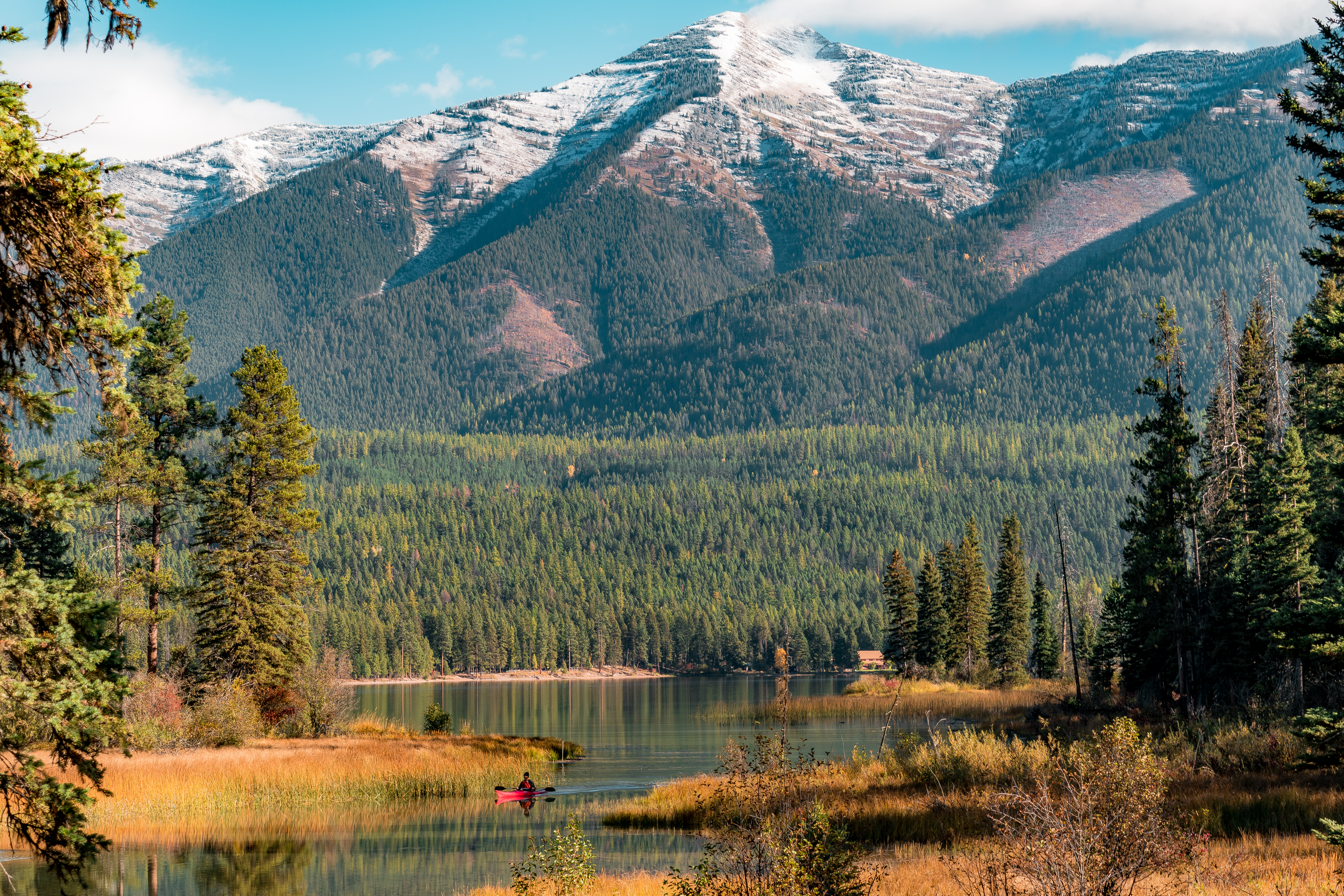
Flathead National Forest in western Montana

The Bitterroot Mountains—one of the longest continuous ranges in the Rocky Mountain chain from Alaska to Mexico—along with smaller ranges, including the Coeur d'Alene Mountains and the Cabinet Mountains, divide the state from Idaho. The southern third of the Bitterroot range blends into the Continental Divide. Other major mountain ranges west of the divide include the Cabinet Mountains, the Anaconda Range, the Missions, the Garnet Range, the Sapphire Mountains, and the Flint Creek Range.

The divide's northern section, where the mountains rapidly give way to prairie, is part of the Rocky Mountain Front. The front is most pronounced in the Lewis Range, located primarily in Glacier National Park. Due to the configuration of mountain ranges in Glacier National Park, the Northern Divide (which begins in Alaska's Seward Peninsula) crosses this region and turns east in Montana at Triple Divide Peak. It causes the Waterton River, Belly, and Saint Mary rivers to flow north into Alberta, Canada. There they join the Saskatchewan River, which ultimately empties into Hudson Bay.

East of the divide, several roughly parallel ranges cover the state's southern part, including the Gravelly Range, Madison Range, Gallatin Range, Absaroka Range, and the Beartooth Mountains, which contain the state's highest point, Granite Peak, at 12,799 feet (3,901 m) high. North of these ranges are the Big Belt Mountains, Bridger Mountains, Tobacco Roots, and several island ranges, including the Crazy Mountains and Little Belt Mountains.

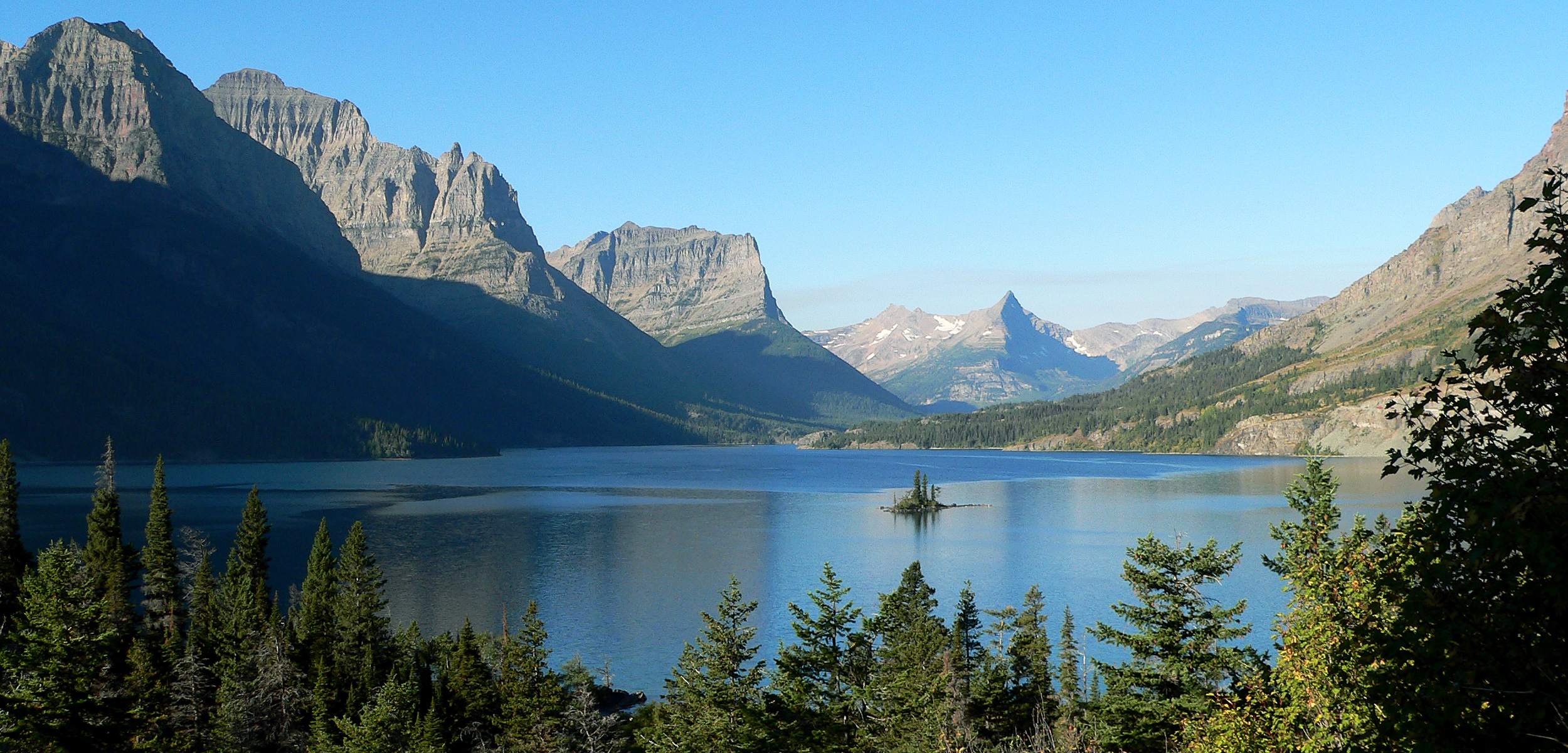
Saint Mary Lake in Glacier National Park

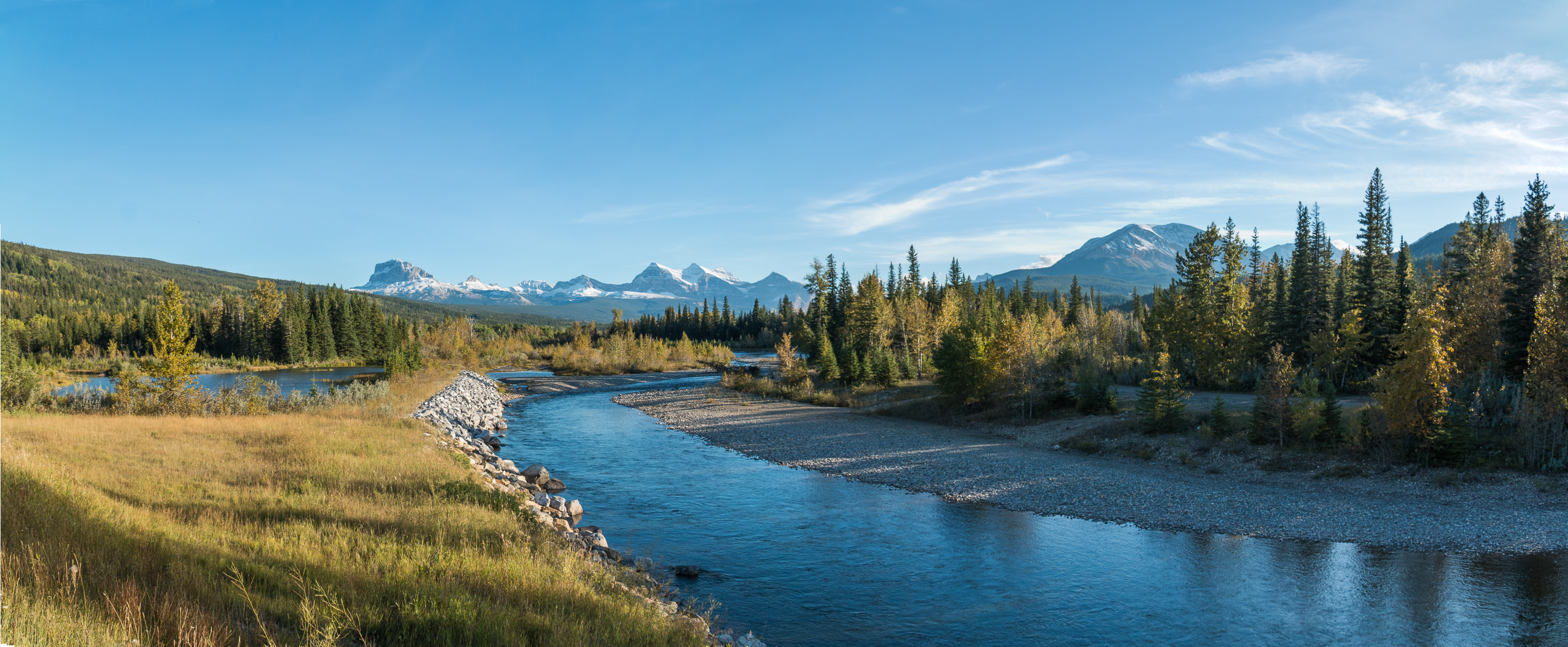
Belly River in Waterton Lakes National Park

Between many mountain ranges are several rich river valleys. The Big Hole Valley, Bitterroot Valley, Gallatin Valley, Flathead Valley, and Paradise Valley have extensive agricultural resources and multiple opportunities for tourism and recreation.

East and north of this transition zone are the expansive and sparsely populated Northern Plains, with tableland prairies, smaller island mountain ranges, and badlands. The isolated island ranges east of the Divide include the Bear Paw Mountains, Bull Mountains, Castle Mountains, Crazy Mountains, Highwood Mountains, Judith Mountains, Little Belt Mountains, Little Rocky Mountains, the Pryor Mountains, Little Snowy Mountains, Big Snowy Mountains, Sweet Grass Hills, and—in the state's southeastern corner near Ekalaka—the Long Pines. Many of these isolated eastern ranges were created about 120 to 66 million years ago when magma welling up from the interior cracked and bowed the earth's surface here.

The area east of the divide in the state's north-central portion is known for the Missouri Breaks and other significant rock formations. Three buttes south of Great Falls are major landmarks: Cascade, Crown, Square, Shaw, and Buttes. Known as laccoliths, they formed when igneous rock protruded through cracks in the sedimentary rock. The underlying surface consists of sandstone and shale. Surface soils in the area are highly diverse, and greatly affected by the local geology, whether glaciated plain, intermountain basin, mountain foothills, or tableland. Foothill regions are often covered in weathered stone or broken slate, or consist of uncovered bare rock (usually igneous, quartzite, sandstone, or shale). The soil of intermountain basins usually consists of clay, gravel, sand, silt, and volcanic ash, much of it laid down by lakes which covered the region during the Oligocene 33 to 23 million years ago. Tablelands are often topped with argillite gravel and weathered quartzite, occasionally underlain by shale. The glaciated plains are generally covered in clay, gravel, sand, and silt left by the proglacial Lake Great Falls or by moraines or gravel-covered former lake basins left by the Wisconsin glaciation 85,000 to 11,000 years ago. Farther east, areas such as Makoshika State Park near Glendive and Medicine Rocks State Park near Ekalaka contain some of the most scenic badlands regions in the state.

The Hell Creek Formation in Northeast Montana is a major source of dinosaur fossils. Paleontologist Jack Horner of the Museum of the Rockies in Bozeman brought this formation to the world's attention with several major finds.

=== Rivers, lakes and reservoirs ===
Montana has thousands of named rivers and creeks, 450 miles (720 km) of which are known for "blue-ribbon" trout fishing. Montana's water resources provide for recreation, hydropower, crop and forage irrigation, mining, and water for human consumption.

Montana is one of few geographic areas in the world whose rivers form parts of three major watersheds (i.e. where two continental divides intersect). Its rivers feed the Pacific Ocean, the Gulf of Mexico, and Hudson Bay. The watersheds divide at Triple Divide Peak in Glacier National Park. If Hudson Bay is considered part of the Arctic Ocean, Triple Divide Peak is the only place on Earth with drainage to three different oceans.

==== Pacific Ocean drainage basin ====
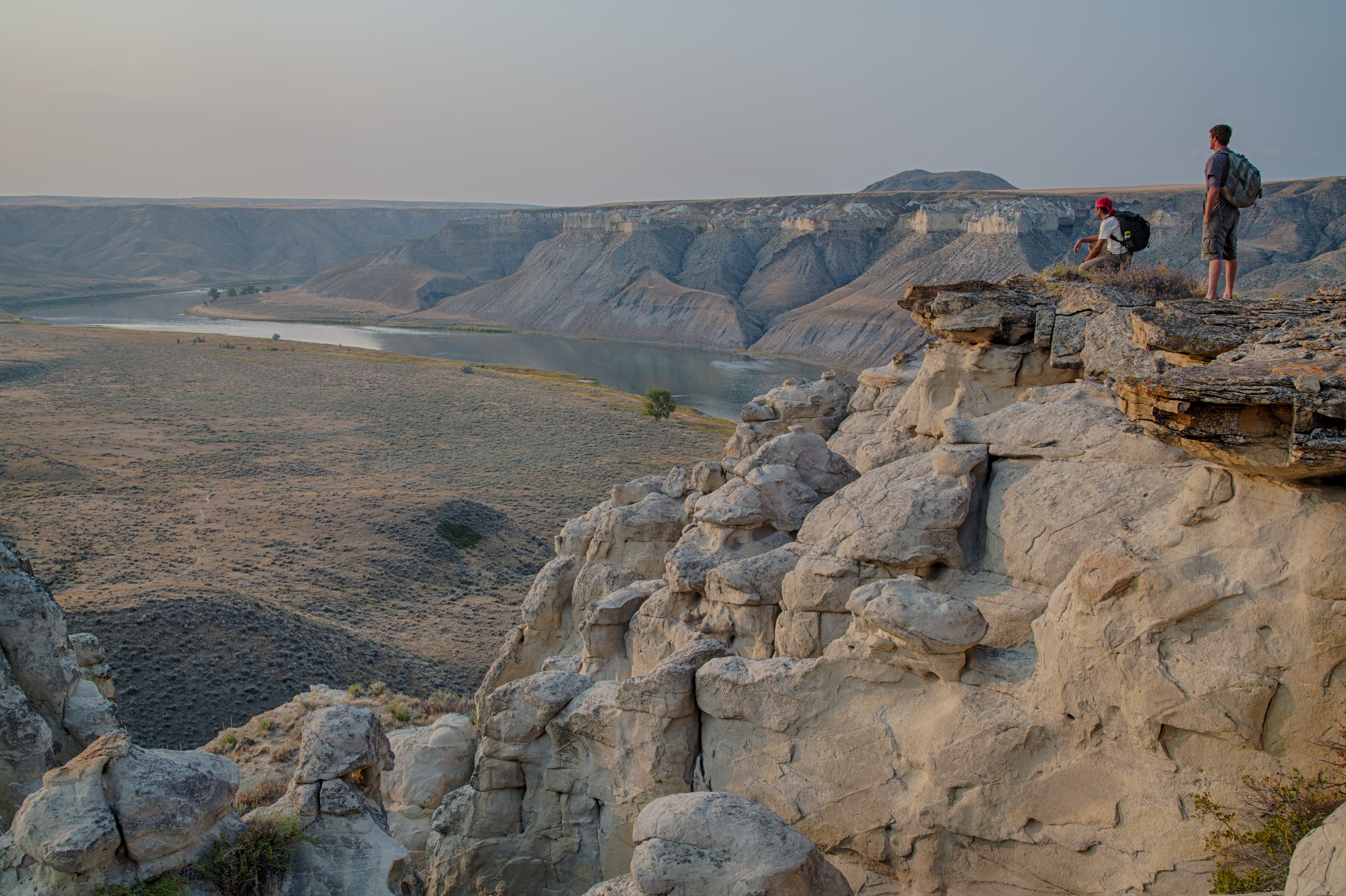
Missouri Breaks region in central Montana

All waters in Montana west of the divide flow into the Columbia River. The Clark Fork of the Columbia (not to be confused with the Clarks Fork of the Yellowstone River) rises near Butte and flows northwest to Missoula, where it is joined by the Blackfoot River and Bitterroot River. Farther downstream, it is joined by the Flathead River before entering Idaho near Lake Pend Oreille. The Pend Oreille River forms the outflow of Lake Pend Oreille. The Pend Oreille River joined the Columbia River, which flows to the Pacific Ocean—making the 579-mile (932 km) long Clark Fork/Pend Oreille (considered a single river system) the longest river in the Rocky Mountains. The Clark Fork discharges the greatest volume of water of any river exiting the state. The Kootenai River in northwest Montana is another major tributary of the Columbia.

==== Gulf of Mexico drainage basin ====
East of the divide the Missouri River, which is formed by the confluence of the Jefferson, Madison, and Gallatin Rivers near Three Forks, flows due north through the west-central part of the state to Great Falls. From this point, it then flows generally east through fairly flat agricultural land and the Missouri Breaks to Fort Peck reservoir. The stretch of river between Fort Benton and the Fred Robinson Bridge at the western boundary of Fort Peck Reservoir was designated a National Wild and Scenic River in 1976. The Missouri enters North Dakota near Fort Union, having drained more than half the land area of Montana (82,000 square miles (210,000 km^{2})). Nearly one-third of the Missouri River in Montana lies behind 10 dams: Toston, Canyon Ferry, Hauser, Holter, Black Eagle, Rainbow, Cochrane, Ryan, Morony, and Fort Peck. Other major Montana tributaries of the Missouri include the Smith, Milk, Marias, Judith, and Musselshell Rivers. Montana also claims the disputed title of possessing the world's shortest river, the Roe River, just outside Great Falls. Through the Missouri, these rivers ultimately join the Mississippi River and flow into the Gulf of Mexico.

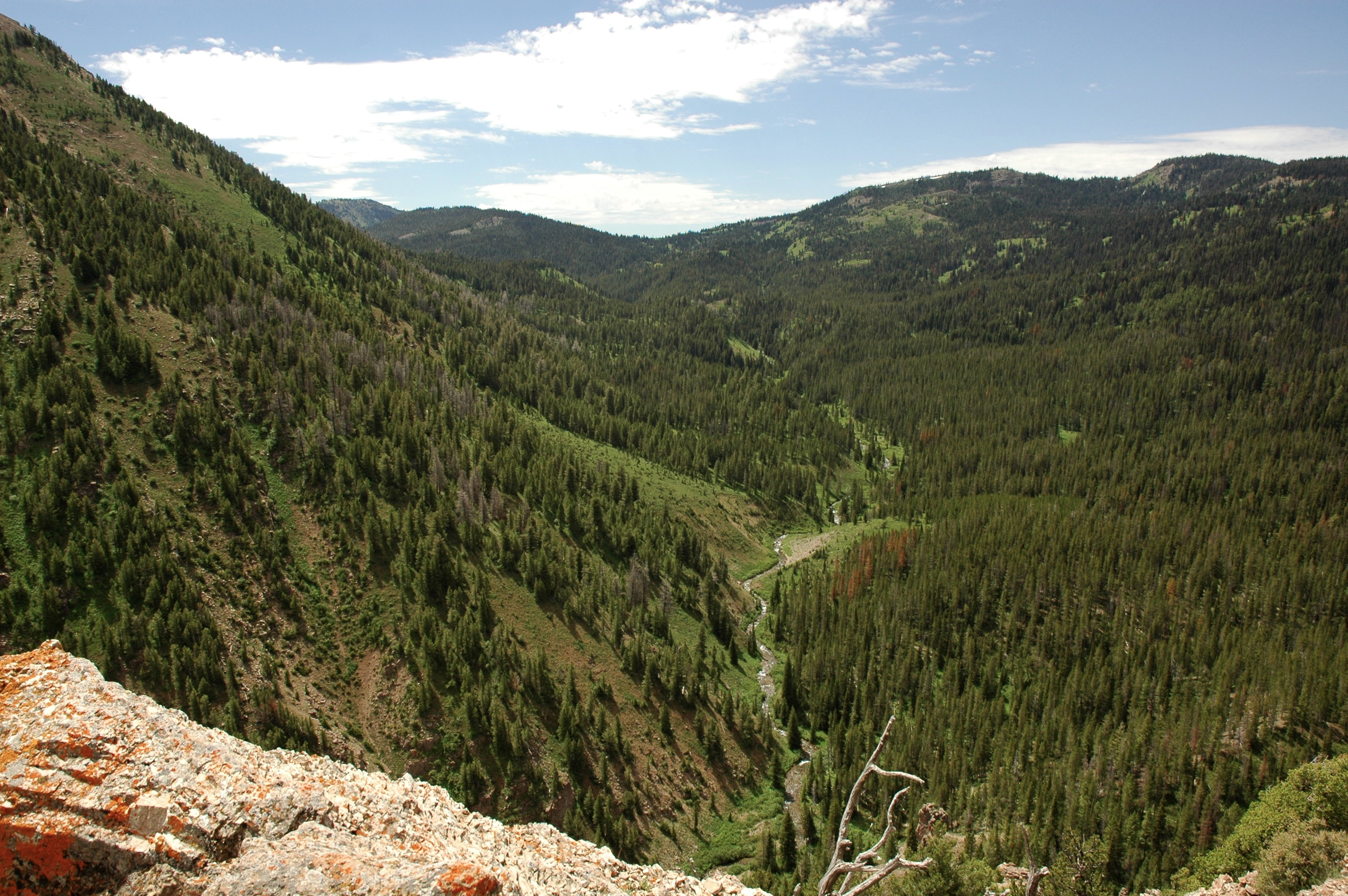
Hell Roaring Canyon in southwest Montana

Hell Roaring Creek begins in southern Montana, and when combined with the Red Rock, Beaverhead, Jefferson, Missouri, and Mississippi River, is the longest river in North America and the fourth longest river in the world.

The Yellowstone River rises on the Continental Divide near Younts Peak in Wyoming's Teton Wilderness. It flows north through Yellowstone National Park, enters Montana near Gardiner, and passes through the Paradise Valley to Livingston. It then flows northeasterly across the state through Billings, Miles City, Glendive, and Sidney. The Yellowstone joins the Missouri in North Dakota just east of Fort Union. It is the longest undammed, free-flowing river in the contiguous United States, and drains about a quarter of Montana (36,000 square miles (93,000 km^{2})). Major tributaries of the Yellowstone include the Boulder, Stillwater, Clarks Fork, Bighorn, Tongue, and Powder Rivers.

==== Hudson Bay drainage basin ====
The Northern Divide turns east in Montana at Triple Divide Peak, causing the Waterton, Belly, and Saint Mary Rivers to flow north into Alberta. There they join the Saskatchewan River, which ultimately empties into Hudson Bay.

==== Lakes and reservoirs ====
Montana has some 3,000 named lakes and reservoirs, including Flathead Lake, the largest natural freshwater lake in the western United States. Other major lakes include Whitefish Lake in the Flathead Valley and Lake McDonald and St. Mary Lake in Glacier National Park. The largest reservoir in the state is Fort Peck Reservoir on the Missouri river, which is contained by the second largest earthen dam and largest hydraulically filled dam in the world. Other major reservoirs include Hungry Horse on the Flathead River; Lake Koocanusa on the Kootenai River; Lake Elwell on the Marias River; Clark Canyon on the Beaverhead River; Yellowtail on the Bighorn River, Canyon Ferry, Hauser, Holter, Rainbow; and Black Eagle on the Missouri River.

== Flora and fauna ==
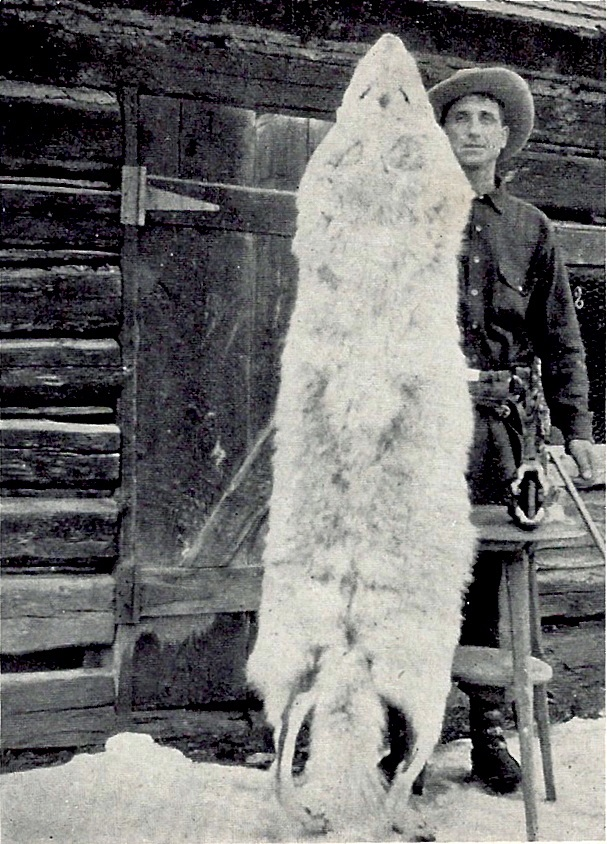
100 pound native Montana wolf taken in 1928

Vegetation of the state includes lodgepole pine, ponderosa pine, Douglas fir, larch, spruce, aspen, birch, red cedar, hemlock, ash, alder, rocky mountain maple and cottonwood trees. Forests cover about 25% of the state. Flowers native to Montana include asters, bitterroots, daisies, lupins, poppies, primroses, columbine, lilies, orchids, and dryads. Several species of sagebrush and cactus and many species of grasses are common. Many species of mushrooms and lichens are also found in the state.

Montana is home to diverse fauna including 14 amphibian, 90 fish, 117 mammal, 20 reptile, and 427 bird species. Additionally, more than 10,000 invertebrate species are present, including 180 mollusks and 30 crustaceans. Montana has the largest grizzly bear population in the lower 48 states. Montana hosts five federally endangered species–black-footed ferret, whooping crane, least tern, pallid sturgeon, and white sturgeon and seven threatened species including the grizzly bear, Canadian lynx, and bull trout. (Note: However, the grizzly bear and Canadian lynx are listed as a threatened species only for the mainland 48 states. In general, the grizzly bear and Canadian lynx are not threatened species; the IUCN lists both as "least concern".) Since re-introduction the gray wolf population has stabilized at about 900 animals, and they have been delisted as endangered. The Montana Department of Fish, Wildlife and Parks manages fishing and hunting seasons for at least 17 species of game fish, including seven species of trout, walleye, and smallmouth bass and at least 29 species of game birds and animals including ring-neck pheasant, grey partridge, elk, pronghorn antelope, mule deer, whitetail deer, gray wolf, and bighorn sheep.

== Protected areas ==
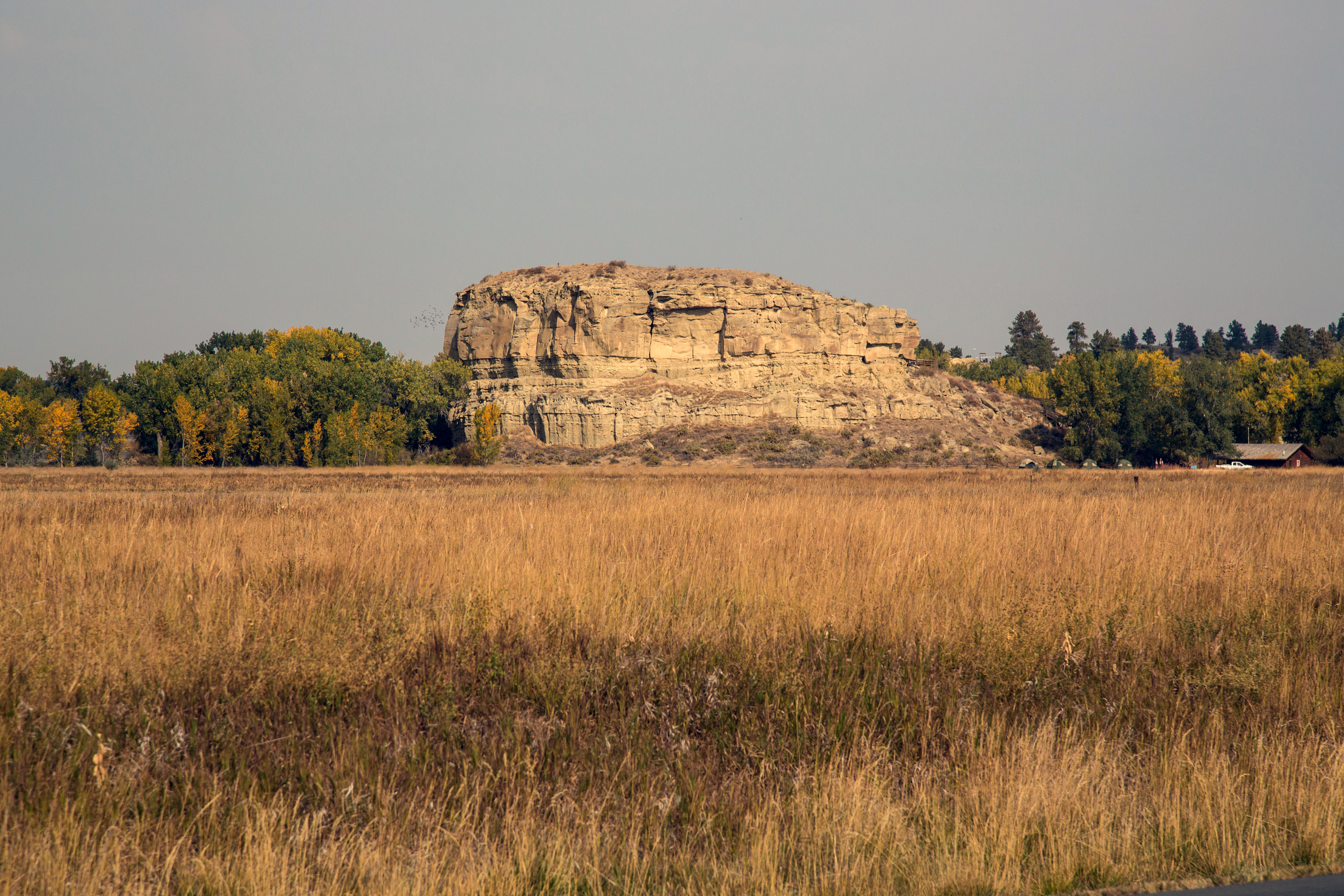
Pompeys Pillar National Monument

Montana contains Glacier National Park, "The Crown of the Continent"; and parts of Yellowstone National Park, including three of the park's five entrances. Other federally recognized sites include the Little Bighorn National Monument, Bighorn Canyon National Recreation Area, and Big Hole National Battlefield. The CSKT Bison Range is managed by the Confederated Salish and Kootenai Tribes and the American Prairie is owned and operated by a non-profit organization.

Federal and state agencies administer approximately 31,300,000 acres (127,000 km^{2}), or 35 percent of Montana's land. The U.S. Department of Agriculture Forest Service administers 16,800,000 acres (68,000 km^{2}) of forest land in ten National Forests. There are approximately 3,300,000 acres (13,000 km^{2}) of wilderness in 12 separate wilderness areas that are part of the National Wilderness Preservation System established by the Wilderness Act of 1964. The U.S. Department of the Interior Bureau of Land Management controls 8,100,000 acres (33,000 km^{2}) of federal land. The U.S. Department of the Interior Fish and Wildlife Service administers 110,000 acres (450 km^{2}) of 1.1 million acres of National Wildlife Refuges and waterfowl production areas in Montana. The U.S. Department of the Interior Bureau of Reclamation administers approximately 300,000 acres (1,200 km^{2}) of land and water surface in the state. The Montana Department of Fish, Wildlife and Parks operate approximately 275,265 acres (1,113.96 km^{2}) of state parks and access points on the state's rivers and lakes. The Montana Department of Natural Resources and Conservation manages 5,200,000 acres (21,000 km^{2}) of School Trust Land ceded by the federal government under the Land Ordinance of 1785 to the state in 1889 when Montana was granted statehood. These lands are managed by the state for the benefit of public schools and institutions in the state.

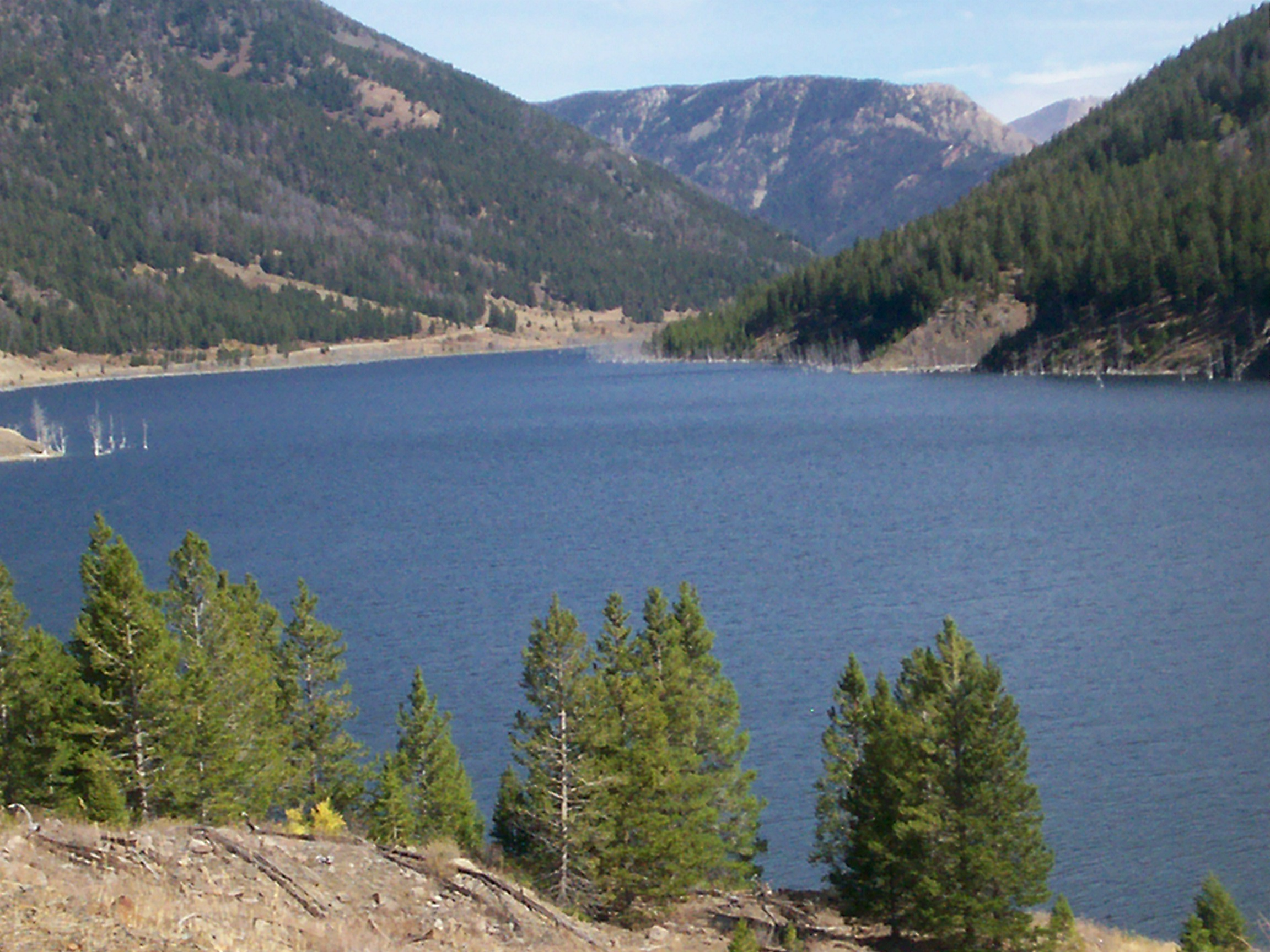
Quake Lake was created by a landslide during the 1959 Hebgen Lake earthquake.

Areas managed by the National Park Service include:

- Big Hole National Battlefield near Wisdom
- Bighorn Canyon National Recreation Area near Fort Smith
- Glacier National Park
- Grant-Kohrs Ranch National Historic Site at Deer Lodge
- Lewis and Clark National Historic Trail
- Little Bighorn Battlefield National Monument near Crow Agency
- Nez Perce National Historical Park
- Yellowstone National Park

== Climate ==
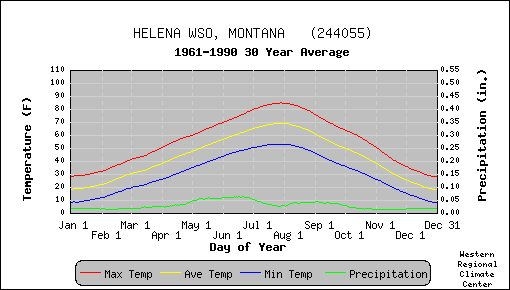
Temperature and precipitation for Montana's capital city, Helena

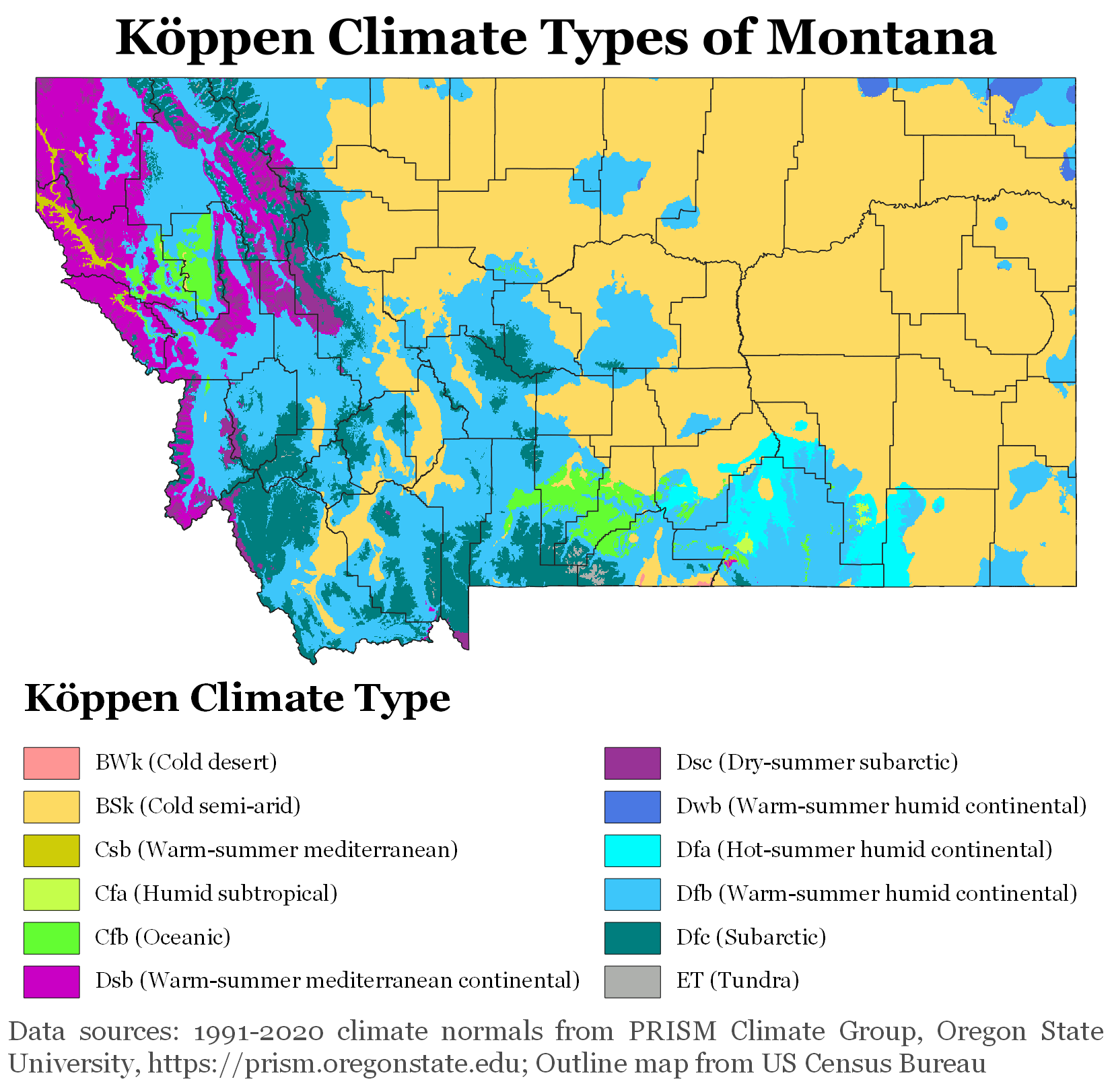
Köppen climate types of Montana, using 1991-2020 climate normals.

Montana is a large state with considerable variation in geography, topography and elevation, and the climate is equally varied. The state spans from below the 45th parallel (the line equidistant between the equator and North Pole) to the 49th parallel, and elevations range from under 2,000 feet (610 m) to nearly 13,000 feet (4,000 m) above sea level. The western half is mountainous, interrupted by numerous large valleys. Eastern Montana comprises plains and badlands, broken by hills and isolated mountain ranges, and has a semi-arid, continental climate (Köppen climate classification BSk). The Continental Divide has a considerable effect on the climate, as it restricts the flow of warmer air from the Pacific from moving east, and drier continental air from moving west. The area west of the divide has a modified northern Pacific Coast climate, with milder winters, cooler summers, less wind, and a longer growing season. Low clouds and fog often form in the valleys west of the divide in winter, but this is rarely seen in the east.

Average daytime temperatures vary from 28 °F or −2.2 °C in January to 84.5 °F or 29.2 °C in July. The variation in geography leads to great variation in temperature. The highest observed summer temperature was 117 °F or 47.2 °C at Glendive on July 20, 1893, and Medicine Lake on July 5, 1937. Throughout the state, summer nights are generally cool and pleasant. Extreme hot weather is less common above 4,000 feet or 1,200 meters. Snowfall has been recorded in all months of the year in the more mountainous areas of central and western Montana, though it is rare in July and August.

The coldest temperature on record for Montana is also the coldest temperature for the contiguous United States. On January 20, 1954, −70 °F or −56.7 °C was recorded at a gold mining camp near Rogers Pass. Temperatures vary greatly on cold nights, and Helena, 40 miles (64 km) to the southeast had a low of only −36 °F or −37.8 °C on the same date, and an all-time record low of −42 °F or −41.1 °C. Winter cold spells are usually the result of cold continental air coming south from Canada. The front is often well defined, causing a large temperature drop in a 24-hour period. Conversely, air flow from the southwest results in "chinooks". These steady 25–50 mph (40–80 km/h) (or more) winds can suddenly warm parts of Montana, especially areas just to the east of the mountains, where temperatures sometimes rise up to 50–60 °F (10.0–15.6 °C) for 10 days or longer.

Loma is the site of the most extreme recorded temperature change in a 24-hour period in the United States. On January 15, 1972, a chinook wind blew in and the temperature rose from −54 to 49 °F (−47.8 to 9.4 °C). Miles City recorded the highest mean sea level pressure in the United States on December 24, 1983.

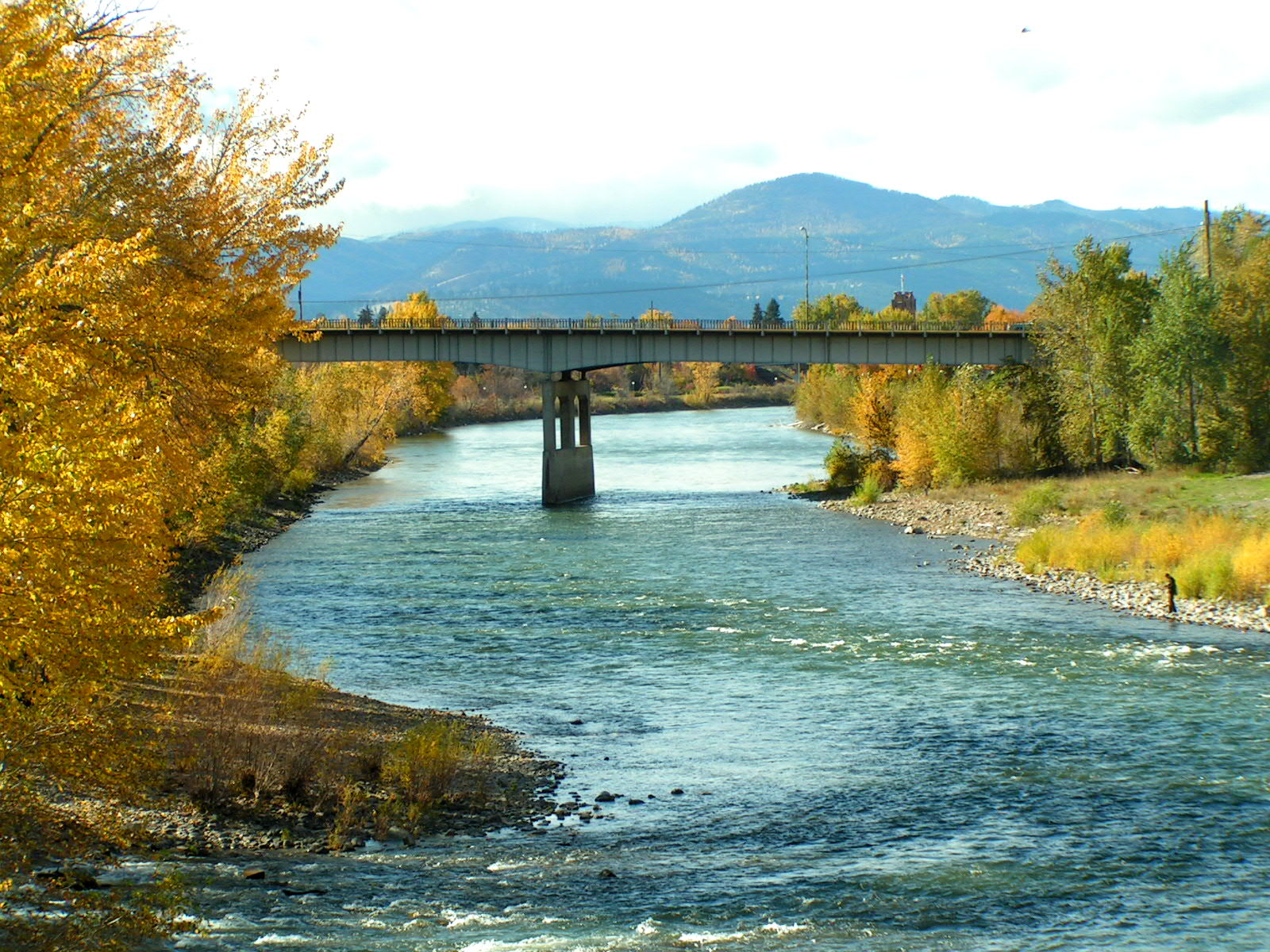
Clark Fork River, Missoula, in autumn

Average annual precipitation is 15 inches (380 mm), but great variations are seen. The mountain ranges block the moist Pacific air, holding moisture in the western valleys, and creating rain shadows to the east. Heron, in the west, receives the most precipitation, 34.70 inches (881 mm). On the eastern (leeward) side of a mountain range, the valleys are much drier; Lonepine averages 11.45 inches (291 mm), and Deer Lodge 11.00 inches (279 mm) of precipitation. The mountains can receive over 100 inches (2,500 mm), for example the Grinnell Glacier in Glacier National Park gets 105 inches (2,700 mm). An area southwest of Belfry averaged only 6.59 inches (167 mm) over a 16-year period. Most of the larger cities get 30 to 50 inches or 0.76 to 1.27 meters of snow each year. Mountain ranges can accumulate 300 inches or 7.62 meters of snow during a winter. Heavy snowstorms may occur from September through May, though most snow falls from November to March.

The climate has become warmer in Montana and continues to do so. The glaciers in Glacier National Park have receded and are predicted to melt away completely in a few decades. Many Montana cities set heat records during July 2007, the hottest month ever recorded in Montana. Winters are warmer, too, and have fewer cold spells. Previously, these cold spells had killed off bark beetles, but these are now attacking the forests of western Montana. The warmer winters in the region have allowed various species to expand their ranges and proliferate. The combination of warmer weather, attack by beetles, and mismanagement has led to a substantial increase in the severity of forest fires in Montana. According to a study done for the U.S. Environmental Protection Agency by the Harvard School of Engineering and Applied Science, parts of Montana will experience a 200% increase in area burned by wildfires and an 80% increase in related air pollution.

The table below lists average temperatures for the warmest and coldest month for Montana's seven largest cities. The coldest month varies between December and January depending on location, although figures are similar throughout.

=== Climate data ===
Average daily maximum and minimum temperatures for selected cities in Montana
Location	July (°F)	Coldest month (°F)	July (°C)	Coldest month (°C)
Billings	89/54	35/17	32/15	4/–9
Missoula	86/51	30/18	31/16	−0/–8
Great Falls	83/51	30/15	34/15	1/–9
Bozeman	81/51	33/16	31/12	−0/–11
Butte	80/45	30/6	30/5	−1/–15
Helena	86/54	30/12	31/12	−0/–11
Kalispell	81/48	30/16	29/14	−1/–10

Climate data for Helena (Köppen BSk) (Note: 1991–2020 normals, extremes 1880–present)
Month	Jan	Feb	Mar	Apr	May	Jun	Jul	Aug	Sep	Oct	Nov	Dec	Year
Record high °F (°C)	63 (17)	69 (21)	78 (26)	86 (30)	95 (35)	104 (40)	105 (41)	105 (41)	102 (39)	87 (31)	76 (24)	70 (21)	105 (41)
Mean maximum °F (°C)	53.2 (11.8)	55.6 (13.1)	66.7 (19.3)	76.6 (24.8)	84.3 (29.1)	91.9 (33.3)	98.0 (36.7)	97.1 (36.2)	91.0 (32.8)	79.0 (26.1)	63.5 (17.5)	53.0 (11.7)	99.3 (37.4)
Mean daily maximum °F (°C)	32.4 (0.2)	37.2 (2.9)	47.5 (8.6)	56.7 (13.7)	66.4 (19.1)	74.7 (23.7)	86.1 (30.1)	84.6 (29.2)	73.3 (22.9)	57.6 (14.2)	42.8 (6.0)	32.6 (0.3)	57.7 (14.2)
Daily mean °F (°C)	23.0 (−5.0)	27.2 (−2.7)	36.1 (2.3)	44.5 (6.9)	53.9 (12.2)	61.7 (16.5)	70.6 (21.4)	68.8 (20.4)	58.9 (14.9)	45.5 (7.5)	32.8 (0.4)	23.4 (−4.8)	45.5 (7.5)
Mean daily minimum °F (°C)	13.5 (−10.3)	17.2 (−8.2)	24.6 (−4.1)	32.4 (0.2)	41.5 (5.3)	48.7 (9.3)	55.1 (12.8)	52.9 (11.6)	44.6 (7.0)	33.5 (0.8)	22.8 (−5.1)	14.2 (−9.9)	33.4 (0.8)
Mean minimum °F (°C)	−12.6 (−24.8)	−5.3 (−20.7)	4.0 (−15.6)	18.4 (−7.6)	28.0 (−2.2)	37.2 (2.9)	45.7 (7.6)	42.0 (5.6)	31.0 (−0.6)	15.3 (−9.3)	1.1 (−17.2)	−8.8 (−22.7)	−19.9 (−28.8)
Record low °F (°C)	−42 (−41)	−42 (−41)	−30 (−34)	−10 (−23)	17 (−8)	30 (−1)	36 (2)	28 (−2)	6 (−14)	−8 (−22)	−39 (−39)	−40 (−40)	−42 (−41)
Average precipitation inches (mm)	0.39 (9.9)	0.42 (11)	0.52 (13)	1.02 (26)	1.95 (50)	2.21 (56)	1.06 (27)	1.04 (26)	0.96 (24)	0.78 (20)	0.59 (15)	0.46 (12)	11.40 (290)
Average snowfall inches (cm)	6.6 (17)	6.6 (17)	4.6 (12)	2.9 (7.4)	0.1 (0.25)	0.0 (0.0)	0.0 (0.0)	0.3 (0.76)	0.2 (0.51)	2.8 (7.1)	5.4 (14)	7.7 (20)	37.2 (96.02)
Average precipitation days (≥ 0.01 in)	6.5	6.5	6.9	8.8	11.2	11.5	7.5	6.3	5.8	7.0	6.5	6.6	91.1
Average snowy days (≥ 0.1 in)	5.6	5.6	3.7	2.1	0.2	0.1	0.0	0.1	0.0	1.5	4.0	5.2	28.1
Source 1: NOAA
Source 2: National Weather Service

Climate data for Billings (Köppen Dfa/BSk) (Note: Billings Logan International Airport), 1991-2020 normals, extremes 1934-present.)
Month	Jan	Feb	Mar	Apr	May	Jun	Jul	Aug	Sep	Oct	Nov	Dec	Year
Record high °F (°C)	68 (20)	72 (22)	80 (27)	90 (32)	96 (36)	105 (41)	108 (42)	105 (41)	103 (39)	91 (33)	77 (25)	73 (23)	108 (42)
Mean maximum °F (°C)	56.3 (13.5)	59.7 (15.4)	70.1 (21.2)	79.0 (26.1)	85.8 (29.9)	94.1 (34.5)	99.9 (37.7)	98.4 (36.9)	93.0 (33.9)	81.3 (27.4)	67.3 (19.6)	56.2 (13.4)	101.1 (38.4)
Mean daily maximum °F (°C)	36.0 (2.2)	39.2 (4.0)	49.0 (9.4)	56.9 (13.8)	66.9 (19.4)	77.0 (25.0)	87.3 (30.7)	85.8 (29.9)	74.3 (23.5)	58.8 (14.9)	45.7 (7.6)	36.1 (2.3)	59.4 (15.2)
Daily mean °F (°C)	27.0 (−2.8)	29.4 (−1.4)	38.0 (3.3)	45.8 (7.7)	55.3 (12.9)	64.7 (18.2)	73.3 (22.9)	71.6 (22.0)	61.4 (16.3)	47.9 (8.8)	36.2 (2.3)	27.6 (−2.4)	48.2 (9.0)
Mean daily minimum °F (°C)	17.9 (−7.8)	19.7 (−6.8)	26.9 (−2.8)	34.7 (1.5)	43.8 (6.6)	52.4 (11.3)	59.3 (15.2)	57.5 (14.2)	48.6 (9.2)	37.1 (2.8)	26.7 (−2.9)	19.2 (−7.1)	37.0 (2.8)
Mean minimum °F (°C)	−7.4 (−21.9)	−2.3 (−19.1)	5.9 (−14.5)	20.9 (−6.2)	30.6 (−0.8)	41.3 (5.2)	50.6 (10.3)	46.5 (8.1)	35.1 (1.7)	18.4 (−7.6)	4.5 (−15.3)	−4.0 (−20.0)	−15.7 (−26.5)
Record low °F (°C)	−30 (−34)	−38 (−39)	−21 (−29)	−5 (−21)	14 (−10)	32 (0)	41 (5)	35 (2)	22 (−6)	−7 (−22)	−22 (−30)	−32 (−36)	−38 (−39)
Average precipitation inches (mm)	0.55 (14)	0.57 (14)	0.90 (23)	1.72 (44)	2.36 (60)	2.22 (56)	1.22 (31)	0.87 (22)	1.36 (35)	1.37 (35)	0.60 (15)	0.57 (14)	14.31 (363)
Average snowfall inches (cm)	10.6 (27)	9.1 (23)	8.2 (21)	7.5 (19)	0.9 (2.3)	0.0 (0.0)	0.0 (0.0)	0.0 (0.0)	0.3 (0.76)	4.5 (11)	6.5 (17)	9.8 (25)	57.4 (146.06)
Average precipitation days (≥ 0.01 in)	6.6	6.9	8.6	10.4	12.2	11.2	7.7	6.0	6.8	8.2	6.1	6.2	96.9
Average snowy days (≥ 0.1 in)	6.8	7.0	6.4	4.2	0.8	0.0	0.0	0.0	0.2	2.5	4.4	6.5	38.8
Source 1: NOAA
Source 2: National Weather Service

Climate data for Miles City (Köppen BSk) (Note: (Miles City Airport), 1991-2020 normals, extremes 1937-present)
Month	Jan	Feb	Mar	Apr	May	Jun	Jul	Aug	Sep	Oct	Nov	Dec	Year
Record high °F (°C)	72 (22)	73 (23)	83 (28)	92 (33)	100 (38)	111 (44)	110 (43)	110 (43)	106 (41)	95 (35)	81 (27)	70 (21)	111 (44)
Mean maximum °F (°C)	52.0 (11.1)	55.8 (13.2)	71.1 (21.7)	80.8 (27.1)	87.3 (30.7)	96.4 (35.8)	102.6 (39.2)	100.8 (38.2)	96.3 (35.7)	83.6 (28.7)	67.5 (19.7)	53.9 (12.2)	104.1 (40.1)
Mean daily maximum °F (°C)	30.1 (−1.1)	34.7 (1.5)	46.8 (8.2)	58.1 (14.5)	68.1 (20.1)	78.6 (25.9)	88.7 (31.5)	87.4 (30.8)	75.6 (24.2)	59.0 (15.0)	44.3 (6.8)	33.1 (0.6)	58.7 (14.8)
Daily mean °F (°C)	19.5 (−6.9)	23.6 (−4.7)	34.7 (1.5)	45.5 (7.5)	55.5 (13.1)	65.6 (18.7)	74.2 (23.4)	72.5 (22.5)	61.2 (16.2)	46.4 (8.0)	32.7 (0.4)	22.4 (−5.3)	46.2 (7.9)
Mean daily minimum °F (°C)	8.9 (−12.8)	12.5 (−10.8)	22.5 (−5.3)	32.9 (0.5)	42.9 (6.1)	52.5 (11.4)	59.6 (15.3)	57.6 (14.2)	46.9 (8.3)	33.8 (1.0)	21.2 (−6.0)	11.7 (−11.3)	33.6 (0.9)
Mean minimum °F (°C)	−16.9 (−27.2)	−8.7 (−22.6)	1.2 (−17.1)	18.1 (−7.7)	29.5 (−1.4)	42.3 (5.7)	50.6 (10.3)	45.9 (7.7)	32.8 (0.4)	17.7 (−7.9)	−0.3 (−17.9)	−11.3 (−24.1)	−23.8 (−31.0)
Record low °F (°C)	−37 (−38)	−37 (−38)	−31 (−35)	2 (−17)	15 (−9)	32 (0)	41 (5)	35 (2)	19 (−7)	−8 (−22)	−25 (−32)	−38 (−39)	−38 (−39)
Average precipitation inches (mm)	0.28 (7.1)	0.26 (6.6)	0.55 (14)	1.54 (39)	2.73 (69)	2.51 (64)	1.51 (38)	0.91 (23)	1.07 (27)	0.97 (25)	0.33 (8.4)	0.22 (5.6)	12.88 (326.7)
Average snowfall inches (cm)	5.8 (15)	3.7 (9.4)	4.3 (11)	4.1 (10)	1.4 (3.6)	0.0 (0.0)	0.0 (0.0)	0.0 (0.0)	0.3 (0.76)	1.0 (2.5)	4.5 (11)	4.4 (11)	29.5 (74.26)
Average precipitation days (≥ 0.01 in)	5.1	5.1	6.3	8.8	12.0	11.1	8.0	6.5	6.5	7.6	5.4	4.3	86.7
Average snowy days (≥ 0.1 in)	5.0	4.0	4.0	1.7	0.6	0.0	0.0	0.0	0.3	0.7	3.7	5.1	25.1
Source 1: National Weather Service
Source 2: NOAA (average snowfall/snowy days 1981-2010)

== Antipodes ==
Montana is one of only two contiguous states (along with Colorado) that are antipodal to land. The Kerguelen Islands are antipodal to the Montana–Saskatchewan–Alberta border. No towns are precisely antipodal to Kerguelen, though Chester and Rudyard are close.

== Cities and towns ==
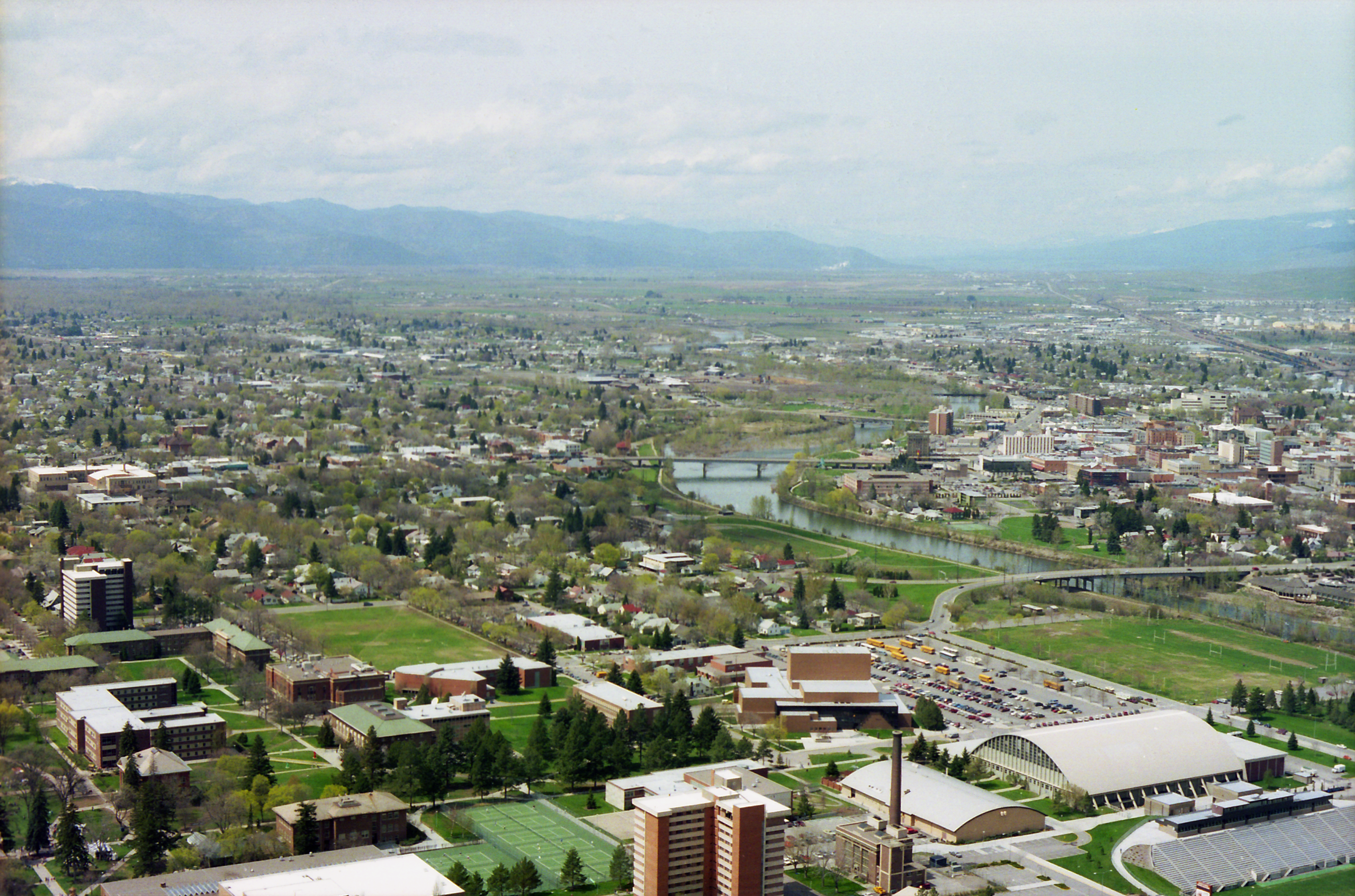
Missoula, the second-largest city in Montana

Montana has 56 counties and a total of 364 "places" as defined by the United States Census Bureau; the latter comprising 129 incorporated places and 235 census-designated places. The incorporated places are made up of 52 cities, 75 towns, and two consolidated city-counties.

Montana has one city, Billings, with a population over 100,000; and three cities with populations over 50,000: Missoula, Great Falls and Bozeman. The state also has five Micropolitan Statistical Areas, centered on Bozeman, Butte, Helena, Kalispell and Havre.

Collectively all of these areas (excluding Havre) are known informally as the "big seven", as they are consistently the seven largest communities in the state (their rank order in terms of population is Billings, Missoula, Great Falls, Bozeman, Butte, Helena and Kalispell, according to the 2010 U.S. Census). Based on 2013 census numbers, they contain 35 percent of Montana's population, and the counties in which they are located are home to 62 percent of the state's population.

The geographic center of population of Montana is in sparsely populated Meagher County, in the town of White Sulphur Springs.

== See also ==
- Regional designations of Montana
- Ecological systems of Montana
- List of mountain ranges in Montana
- List of forests in Montana
- Geography of Alberta
- Geography of Idaho
