= McDonald Glacier =

Glacier in Montana, United States

- Location within Montana
- Type: Mountain glacier
- Location: Mission Mountains, Lake County, Montana, U.S.
- Coordinates: 47°23′13″N 113°55′02″W
- Area: Approximately 45 acres (0.18 km^{2})
- Terminus: Talus
- Status: Unknown

The McDonald Glacier is in the U.S. state of Montana. The glacier is in the Mission Mountains at an elevation of 8,600 feet (2,600 m) above sea level and is immediately north of McDonald Peak. The glacier covers approximately 45 acres (0.18 km^{2}) and is located in a cirque below McDonald Peak.

== See also ==
- List of glaciers in the United States
