= Mount Calowahcan =

Mountain in Montana, United States

- Mission Mountain Range formally called "Mount Harding"
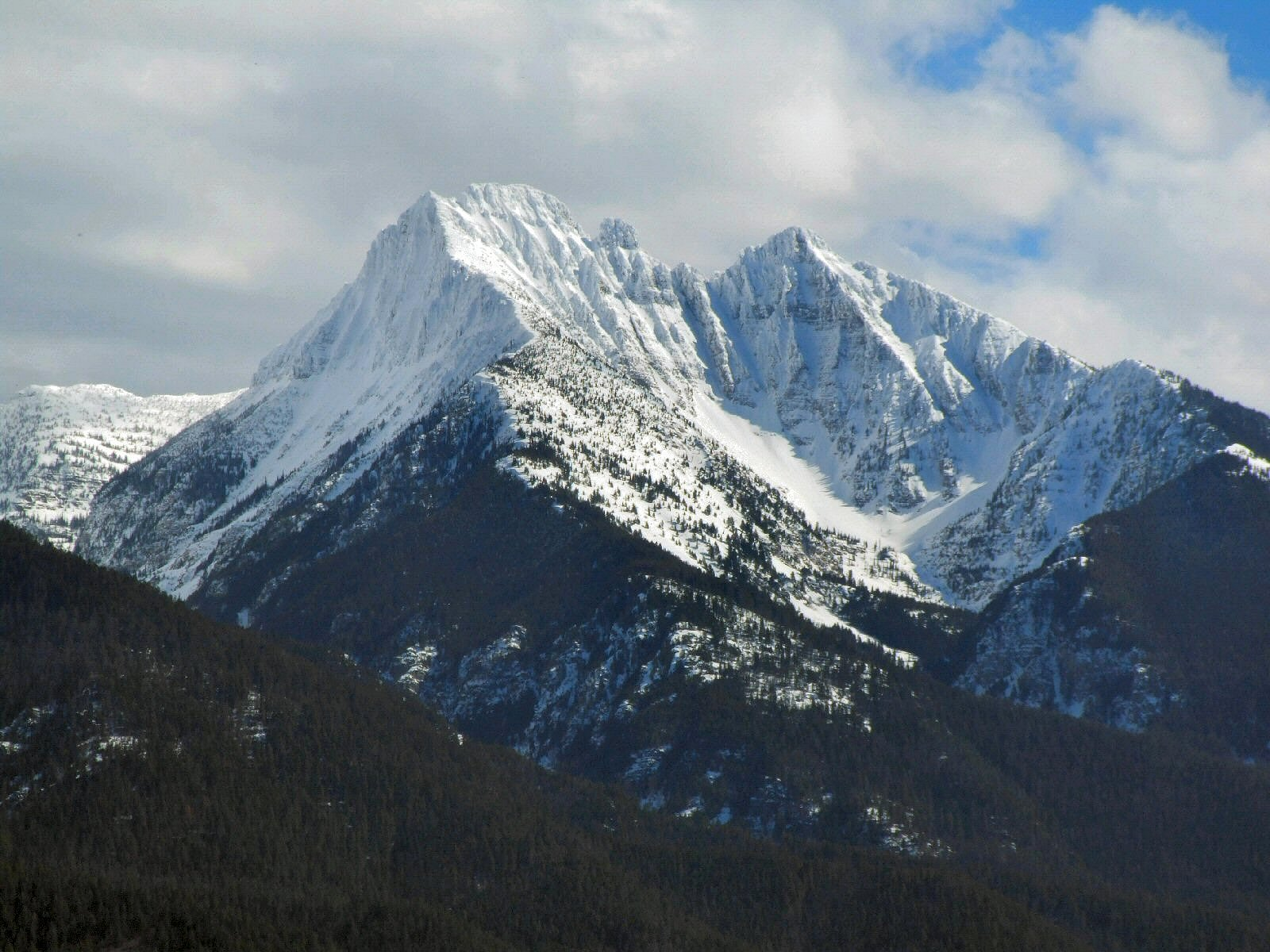
- West aspect, March 2006

Highest point
- Elevation: 9,065 ft (2,763 m) NAVD 88
- Prominence: 2,021 ft (616 m)
- Coordinates: 47°27′28″N 113°56′37″W

Geography
- Location within Montana
- Location: Lake County, Montana, US
- Parent range: Mission Mountains

Climbing
- Easiest route: Scramble

Mount Calowahcan (previously named Mount Harding) is sixth highest peak in the Mission Mountains and is located in northwestern Montana in the United States. East of the mountain is the Swan Valley and to the west side is the Mission Valley.

== Hiking and Recreation ==
As most of the Mission Mountains fall under special protection, land use is limited largely to recreation. Motorized trail bikes, motorcycles, three- and-four-wheelers, snowmobiles, hang-gliders and mountain bikes are not permitted. Getting caught with one will result in a ticket.

Non-tribal members passing through land belonging to the Confederated Salish and Kootenai Tribes are required to carry a valid tribal lands-usage permit, which can easily be obtained at local sporting goods stores. The pass is good from March 1 to February 28/29 and allows limited access to the Mission Mountains, stretches of the Flathead River, among others. Please refer to the current year's regulations.

== Protected Areas ==
Mount Calowahcan falls under the management of the Confederated Salish and Kootenai Tribes of the Flathead Nation.

It is also part of the Flathead National Forest, under which the Mission Mountains Wilderness is designated as a wilderness area. The wilderness area is in the Swan Lake Ranger District. The 73,877 acre wilderness was designated on Jan. 4, 1975 and is managed under the Wilderness Act of 1964.

To the south of Mount Calowahcan includes a large grizzly bear protection area which is usually closed to hikers from July through September. This allows the bears to feed on lady bugs and cut worms, and attempts to keep bear-human contact to a minimum.

== See also ==
- List of mountain ranges in Montana
- Mission Mountains Wilderness
- Flathead National Forest
