= McDonald Peak =

Mountain in Montana, United States

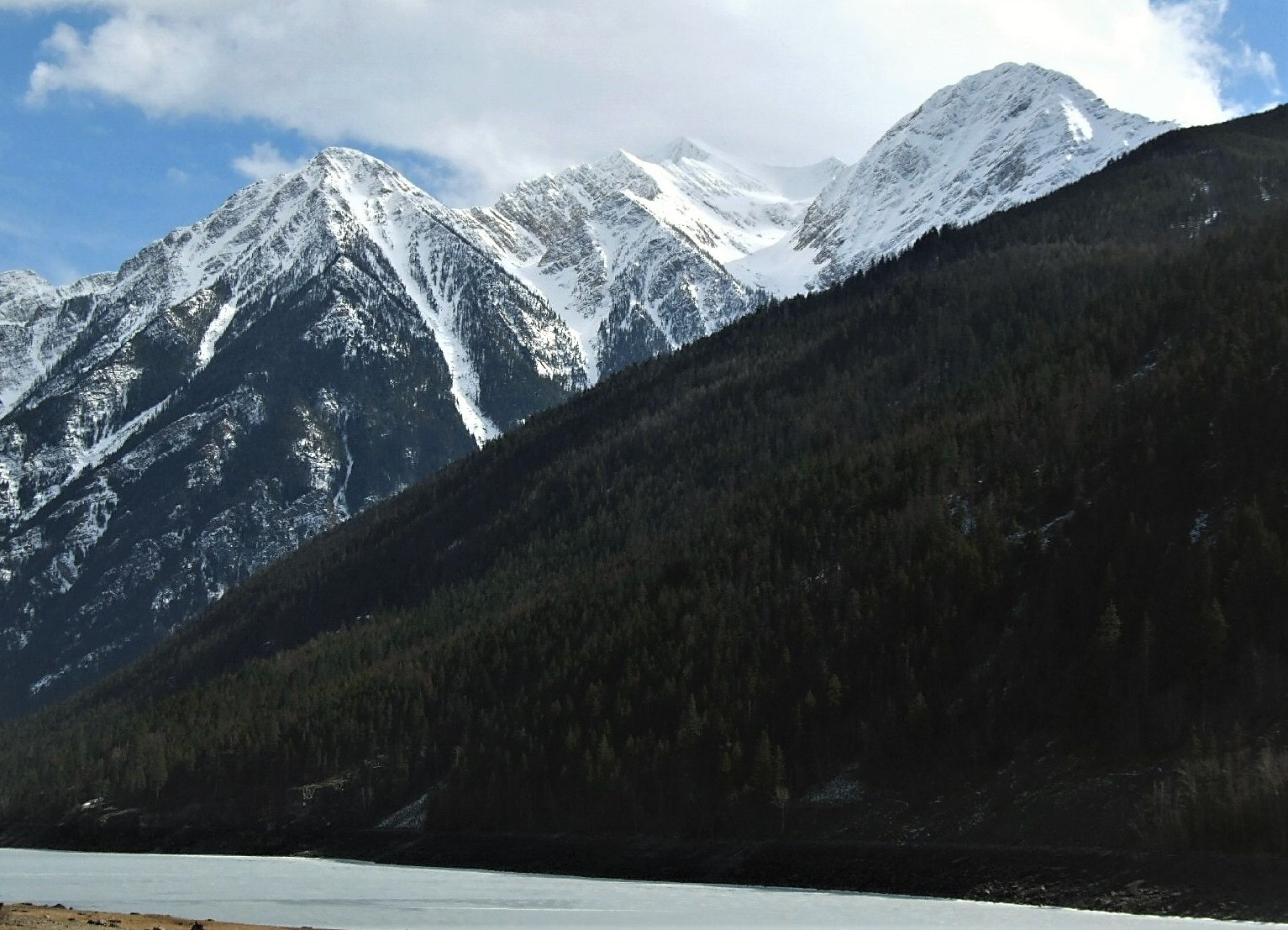
- McDonald Peak, highest in the Mission Mountains

Highest point
- Elevation: 9,824 ft (2,994 m)
- Prominence: 5,640 ft (1,720 m)
- Listing: US most prominent peaks 83rd
- Coordinates: 47°22′58″N 113°55′09″W

Geography
- Location within Montana Location within the United States
- Location: Lake County, Montana, U.S.
- Parent range: Mission Mountains
- Topo map(s): USGS Mount Calowahcan, MT

McDonald Peak, elevation 9,820 feet (2,993 m), is located in the U.S. state of Montana and is the highest peak in the Mission Mountains. McDonald Peak is situated within the Flathead Indian Reservation. The peak has the second greatest topographic prominence (after Crazy Peak) of all summits within Montana and is almost 80 miles (130 km) away from the next highest mountain in the state. McDonald Glacier is on the north slope of the peak.

During the summer the summit and surrounding area are inhabited by grizzly bears for the purpose of feeding on insects. Consequently, in the interests of conservation and safety, the area is closed to hikers between July 15 and September 30.

== Climate ==
Climate data for McDonald Peak 47.3863 N, 113.9171 W, Elevation: 9,160 ft (2,792 m) (1991–2020 normals)
| Month | Jan | Feb | Mar | Apr | May | Jun | Jul | Aug | Sep | Oct | Nov | Dec | Year |
|---|---|---|---|---|---|---|---|---|---|---|---|---|---|
| Mean daily maximum °F (°C) | 22.9 (−5.1) | 22.6 (−5.2) | 26.6 (−3.0) | 32.2 (0.1) | 41.4 (5.2) | 49.1 (9.5) | 60.3 (15.7) | 60.5 (15.8) | 51.7 (10.9) | 38.0 (3.3) | 26.7 (−2.9) | 21.6 (−5.8) | 37.8 (3.2) |
| Daily mean °F (°C) | 16.0 (−8.9) | 14.4 (−9.8) | 17.5 (−8.1) | 22.4 (−5.3) | 31.0 (−0.6) | 38.2 (3.4) | 48.0 (8.9) | 48.1 (8.9) | 40.0 (4.4) | 28.8 (−1.8) | 20.1 (−6.6) | 15.2 (−9.3) | 28.3 (−2.1) |
| Mean daily minimum °F (°C) | 9.2 (−12.7) | 6.3 (−14.3) | 8.3 (−13.2) | 12.6 (−10.8) | 20.5 (−6.4) | 27.2 (−2.7) | 35.8 (2.1) | 35.7 (2.1) | 28.3 (−2.1) | 19.7 (−6.8) | 13.5 (−10.3) | 8.7 (−12.9) | 18.8 (−7.3) |
| Average precipitation inches (mm) | 8.94 (227) | 7.05 (179) | 7.73 (196) | 6.69 (170) | 6.18 (157) | 6.01 (153) | 1.83 (46) | 1.88 (48) | 3.43 (87) | 5.42 (138) | 7.88 (200) | 8.46 (215) | 71.5 (1,816) |
Source: PRISM Climate Group

== See also ==
- List of mountain peaks of North America
  - List of mountain peaks of the United States
    - List of Ultras of the United States

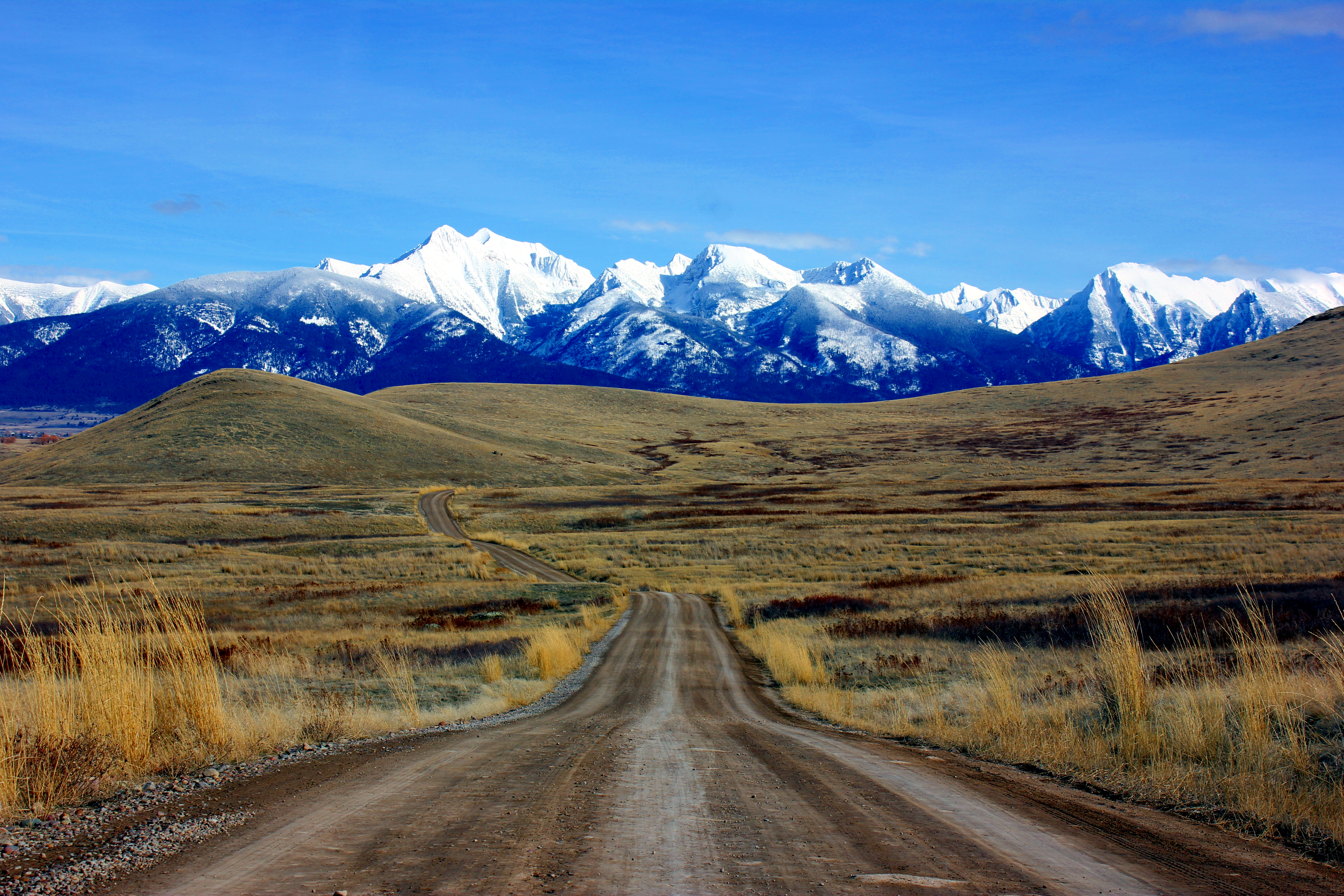
West aspect of McDonald Peak, left of center
