= Regions of Montana =

Overview of the Regional designations of Montana

Montana State Flag

The Regional designations of Montana vary widely within the U.S state of Montana. The state is a large geographical area (147,046 square miles (380,850 km^{2})) that is split by the Continental Divide, resulting in watersheds draining into the Pacific Ocean, Gulf of Mexico and Hudson's Bay. The state is approximately 545 miles (877 km) east to west along the Canada–United States border and 320 miles (510 km) north to south. The fourth largest state in land area, it has been divided up in official and unofficial ways into a variety of regions. Additionally, Montana is part of a number of larger federal government administrative regions.

== Unofficial designations ==
Various parts of Montana have been given a number of formal and informal names, including:

- Eastern Montana, with varying definitions placing the western boundary anywhere from the Continental Divide to areas east of Billings, Montana.
- Western Montana, with varying definitions placing the eastern boundary anywhere from the Continental Divide to the eastern edge of the Absaroka Range.
- Central Montana, with varying definitions.
- The Hi-Line, a region of northern Montana close to the Canada–United States border along which runs the main line of the Great Northern Railway and U.S. Highway 2.
- The "Golden Triangle," an area noted for grain growing, outlined by the cities of Havre, Conrad and Great Falls.
- Greater Yellowstone Ecosystem, which includes all or parts of Gallatin and Custer National Forests in addition to Yellowstone National Park
- Many Glacier, is a region within Glacier National Park. The region is located north of the Going-to-the-Sun Road, on the east side of the park.
- Medicine Line, the name given the 49th parallel border between the U.S. and Canada between Lake of the Woods and the continental divide by Native Americans because of its seemingly magical ability to prevent U.S. soldiers from crossing it.
- The Flathead, encompassing the area around Flathead Lake and surrounding communities
- Two Medicine, is the collective name of a region located in the southeastern section of Glacier National Park.
- The Bitterroot, centered on Ravalli County and Hamilton, the county seat.

== Official state regions ==
=== Tourism regions ===
The Montana Official Travel Site (visitmt.com) has designated six distinct regions in the state for travel promotion.

- Custer Country, comprising Big Horn, Carter, Custer, Dawson, Fallon, Golden Valley, Musselshell, Powder River, Prairie, Rosebud, Treasure, Wibaux, Yellowstone counties. Includes the Little Bighorn Battlefield National Monument.
- Glacier Country, comprising Flathead, Glacier, Granite, Lake, Lincoln, Mineral, Missoula, Ravalli, and Sanders counties. Includes Glacier National Park.
- Gold West Country, comprising Beaverhead, Broadwater, Deer Lodge, Jefferson, Lewis and Clark, Madison, Powell, and Silver Bow counties.
- Missouri River Country, comprising Daniel, Garfield, McCone, Phillips, Richland, Roosevelt, Sheridan, Valley counties. Includes major portions of the Montana Dinosaur Trail.
- Russell Country, comprising Blaine, Cascade, Chouteau, Fergus, Glacier, Hill, Liberty, Meagher, Petroleum, Pondera, Toole, and Teton counties. The region is named for the influence on the area by cowboy artist Charles M. Russell.
- Yellowstone Country, comprising Carbon, Gallatin, Park, Stillwater and Sweet Grass counties. Includes northern and western gateways to Yellowstone National Park.

=== Department of Fish, Wildlife and Parks regions ===
The Montana Department of Fish, Wildlife and Parks has designated seven administrative regions for the purposes of fish, wildlife and parks management.

- Region 1, Northwest Montana, (Kalispell, Montana), includes Flathead Lake
- Region 2, West Central Montana, (Missoula, Montana), includes the Clark Fork, Blackfoot and Bitterroot rivers.
- Region 3, Southwest Montana, (Bozeman, Montana), includes the Madison, Gallatin, Jefferson, upper Missouri, upper Yellowstone, Beaverhead, and Big Hole rivers.
- Region 4, North Central Montana, (Great Falls, Montana), includes the lower Missouri and Smith rivers.
- Region 5, South Central Montana, (Billings, Montana), includes the Yellowstone, Stillwater, Bighorn, and Boulder rivers.
- Region 6, North East Montana, (Glasgow, Montana), includes Fort Peck Reservoir on the Missouri River.
- Region 7, South East Montana, (Miles City, Montana), includes the Missouri, Yellowstone and Tongue rivers.

== Federal government regions ==
=== U.S. Fish and Wildlife Service ===
The U.S. Fish and Wildlife Service includes Montana in the Mountain-Prairie region which includes Colorado, Kansas, Nebraska, North Dakota, South Dakota, Utah, and Wyoming.

=== Bureau of Indian Affairs agencies ===
Montana east of the continental divide and Wyoming make up the Rocky Mountain Region of the Bureau of Indian Affairs (BIA) which includes the following Indian agencies in Montana.

- Blackfeet Agency, services the Blackfeet Indian Reservation in Glacier and Pondera Counties.
- Crow Agency, services the Crow Indian Reservation in Big Horn, Yellowstone, and Treasure counties.
- Fort Belknap Agency, services the Fort Belknap Indian Reservation in Blaine and Phillips counties.
- Fort Peck Agency, services the Fort Peck Indian Reservation in Roosevelt, Valley, Daniels, and Sheridan counties. The agency administers off-reservation trust lands in Montana for the Turtle Mountain Indian Reservation.
- Northern Cheyenne Agency, services the Northern Cheyenne Indian Reservation in Rosebud and Big Horn counties.
- Rocky Boy's Agency, services the Rocky Boy Indian Reservation in Hill and Chouteau County.
- The Flathead Agency is in the BIA Northwest Region and services the Flathead Indian Reservation in Lake, Sanders, Missoula, and Flathead counties.

=== Bureau of Land Management ===
The Bureau of Land Management (BLM) includes Montana with North and South Dakota in its Montana-Dakotas region. The BLM administers Montana through nine regional field offices.

- Billings office
- Butte office
- Dillon office
- Glasgow office
- Havre office
- Lewistown office
- Malta office
- Miles City office
- Missoula office

=== National Weather Service ===
Montana is part of the Western Region of the U.S. Department of Commerce, National Oceanic and Atmospheric Administration's National Weather Service (NWS). The NWS maintains four regional offices in Montana.

- Billings
- Glasgow
- Great Falls
- Missoula

The NWS designates regional weather reports originating from these offices as Southeastern Montana, Northeastern Montana, Central Montana and Western Montana/Central Idaho.

=== Social Security Administration ===
Montana is included in the Denver Region of the Social Security Administration along with Colorado, North Dakota, South Dakota, Wyoming and Utah.

=== U.S. Army Corps of Engineers ===
Montana is included in the Omaha District of the U.S. Army Corps of Engineers Northwestern Division.

== Climate regions ==
In the Köppen climate classification system, Montana is predominantly a BSk (Semi-arid or Steppe) climate, with the Mountainous areas, mostly in the western parts of the state, listed as Dfb (humid continental). Areas near Granite Peak and the highest elevations in Glacier National Park are Dfc (Continental subarctic), and a small area in the northwestern corner of the state near the Idaho border listed as Dsb (Warm summer continental). The United States Department of Agriculture places most of Montana in Plant Hardiness Zones 3 and 4, with limited areas in zone 5 with a small sliver of the state centered in Sanders County in zone 6. These zone boundaries correspond closely to the Köppen classifications. For purposes of the 2009 International Energy Conservation Code, which provides minimum insulation standards for home construction based on climate, the entire state is classified in climate zone 6, requiring higher levels of insulation than are recommended in more temperate climates.
