= Mission Mountains =

Mountain range in Montana, United States

- Mission Range "The Missions"
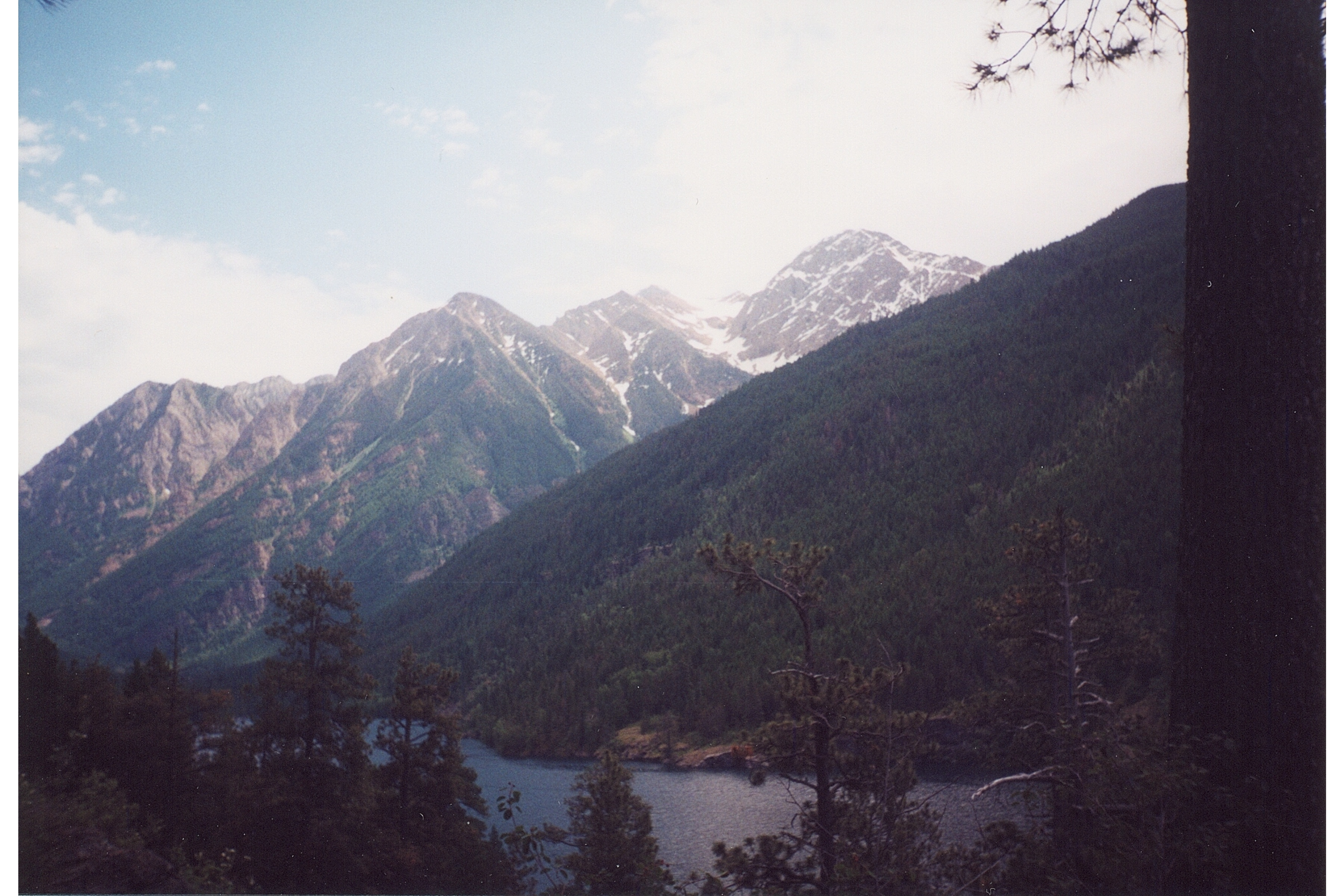
- Looking towards McDonald Peak, high point of the Mission Mountains, rising above McDonald Lake

Highest point
- Peak: McDonald Peak
- Elevation: 9,820 ft (2,990 m)
- Coordinates: 47°22′58″N 113°55′09″W

Geography
- Country: United States
- State: Montana

The Mission Mountains or Mission Range are a range of the Rocky Mountains located in northwestern Montana in the United States. They lie chiefly in Lake County and Missoula County and are south and east of Flathead Lake and west of the Swan Range. On the east side of the range is the Swan River Valley and on the west side the Mission Valley.

The highest point in the Mission Mountains is McDonald Peak at 9,820 feet (2,990 m). The range is named for its proximity to the Jesuit St. Ignatius Mission, established in the mid-19th century in what is today St. Ignatius, Montana.

== Geology ==
The Mission Mountains are composed largely of what is called "Belt Rock" from the Belt Supergroup. The sedimentary rocks in this group formed between 1.47 and 1.4 billion years ago in the Belt Basin. The roughly circular basin collected sediments from surrounding areas for millions of years. The basin was eventually buried and later re-exposed through the collision of several tectonic plates around 80 million years ago.

Much of the Belt Rock found in the Mission Mountains is a crumbly sedimentary rock known as mudstone. The mudstone in the Belt supergroup is often characterized by mudcracks, which points to it being formed while wet, drying, cracking, and then being repeatedly flooded with new wet material that also dried and cracked.

Most of the rock in the Mission Mountains hails from the end of the Proterozoic Eon, towards the end of what is called Precambrian time. Because they are so old, the only evidence of life in the rocks is algae blooms and very basic plant fossils. These organisms played, however, the important role of converting carbon dioxide in the water into oxygen that was pumped into the acidic and poorly oxygenated atmosphere.

The color of the mudstone in the Missions has much to do with the presence of the mineral hematite during its formation. Hematite is formed by iron particles' reaction to oxygen in the atmosphere. Green and gray stones found in the Missions were most likely formed in deep water, the red in more shallow water. Ripple marks can be found in much of the rock; they would have formed mostly in shallow water with gentle waves.

=== Uplift ===
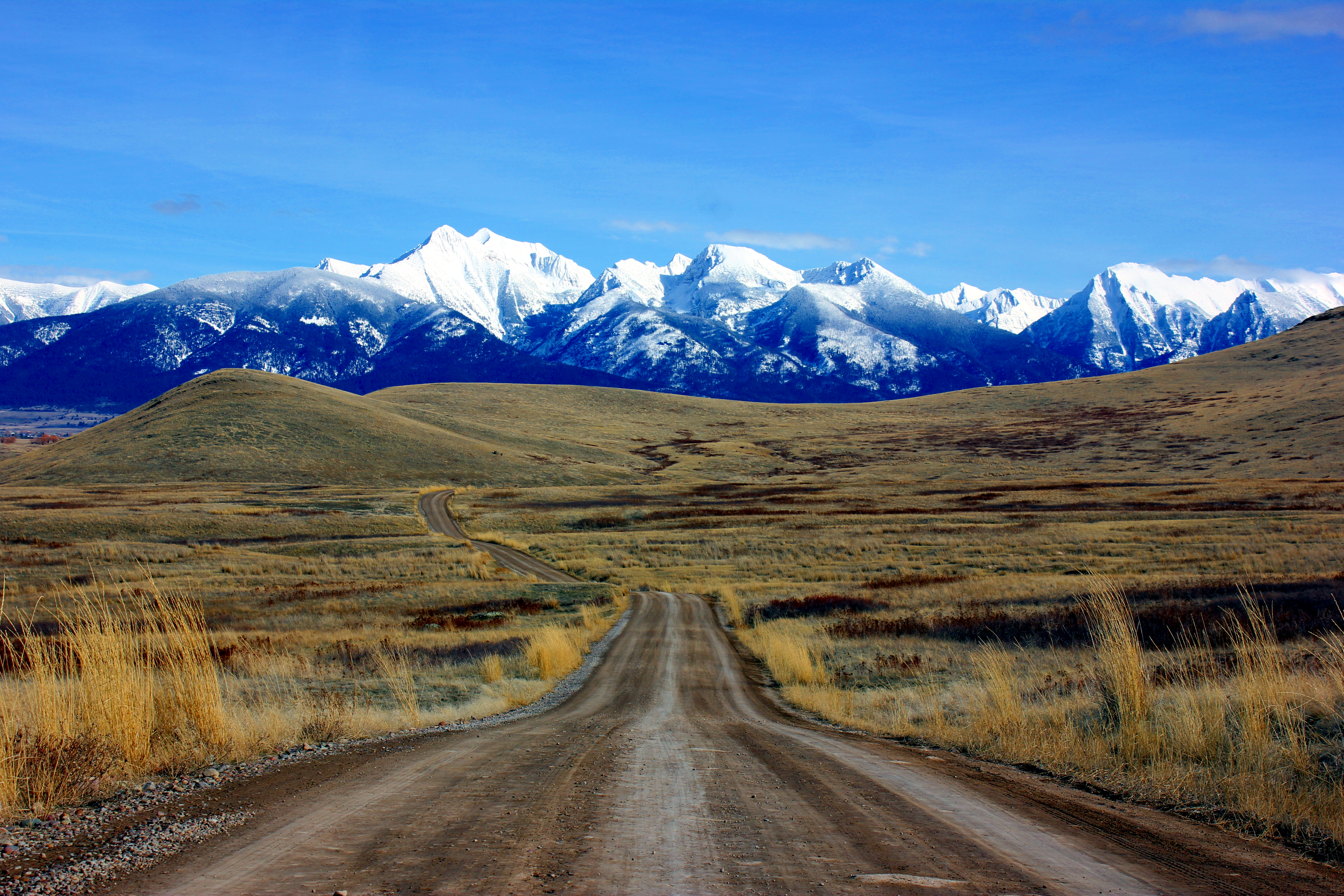
Mission Mountains viewed from the National Bison Range

The features of the Mission Mountains strongly reflect work of the last few ice ages, the latest of those being just over 10,000 years ago. But the range is also the product of a much longer story, one that can be started with the breakup of the Pangaea super-continent. As the continents began to spread out, the North American Plate inched westward, grinding over and against the Pacific Plate as it went. This subduction of the Pacific Plate caused the rise of the Rocky Mountains and thereby the Missions.

About 66 million years ago, this process of uplift began to slow. This time, called the Cenozoic Era, is when the area began to look much like it does today. Looking at the globe at that time, the continents would have been about where they are today and plant and animal life would be recognizable. At that time, however, the deep valleys of western Montana would not yet have formed.

This development is believed to have come about 40 million years ago as the extensional forces that caused the uplift of the Rockies began to cause the crust to thin and crack. Near-vertical faults formed almost uniformly throughout the region, most trending northwest to southeast. The blocks then broke up, some dropping and creating valleys like the Flathead and the Swan. In all, the whole process took around 100 million years.

=== Pleistocene glaciation ===
Three million years ago, at the end of the Cenozoic Era, western Montana would have been full of tall mountains, but it was the next geologic process that made them what they are today. Large glaciers began to form in the area 2–3 million years ago; this was the beginning of the Pleistocene Epoch. Since then, ending just 10,000 years ago, the Mission Mountains and their surroundings have been shaped by water.

The formation of the Flathead Lobe of the Alberta Cordilleran ice sheet is what set this history into motion. At its thickest points, the Flathead Lobe glacier may have extended 4,000 feet above the valley floor. The glacier reached hundreds of miles down the Rocky Mountain Trench, ending as far south as St. Ignatius, Montana. At the northern end of the range, the glacier flow split, in part flowing slowly into the Swan Valley.

A view of the area at that time would have been majestic, with large glaciers flowing around both sides and partially over the range. Smaller glaciers would have also flowed out of the mountains and joined the larger one in the valley. This explains the southward pointed, hook-shaped ridges at the end of each canyon in the range.

These processes also gave the Mission Mountains their distinct shapes. The many three-sided peaks, called horns or pyramidal peaks, and the knife-like ridges of the southern half of the range are results of the heavy mountain glaciation. The northern half of the range was largely rolled over by the Flathead Lobe, which was much like a huge moving ice sheet. This led to the shorter, more rounded features of the northern half of the range.

The Pleistocene was a time of dramatic and quick sculpting in the Mission Mountains. And though that epoch has ended, the erosion continues. Rain, snow, ice, wind, and other forces continue to work at the alpine landscape of the Missions.

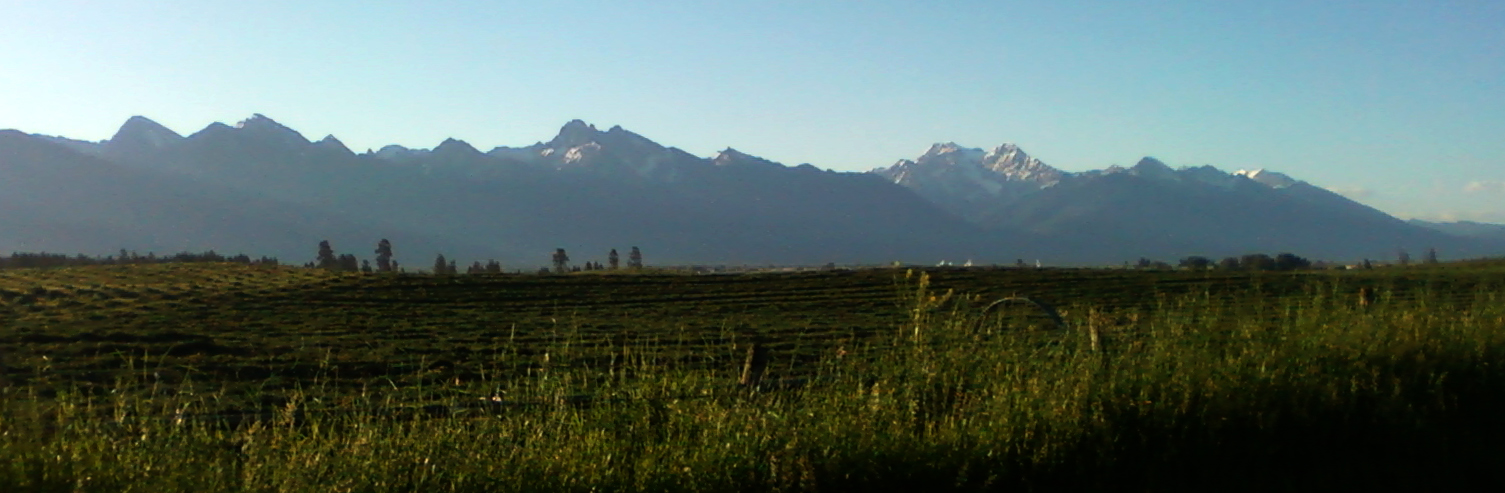
Mission Mountains as seen from Leighton Road near Ronan, Montana in 2010.

== Human history ==
Recorded human contact with the Mission Mountains began with the native peoples thousands of years ago and runs up to the present. The Salish and Kootenai people have traditionally used the mountains as a place for fishing, hunting, berry-picking, and for performing sacred ceremonies.

The first major outside attention to the Mission Mountains came in the 1920s. Forest service employee Theodore Shoemaker led several parties of visitors thorough the range between 1922 and 1924, one of which included members of the Great Pacific Railway Company, which owned a great deal of land in the range. On a 1923 trip Shoemaker triangulated the locations of several peaks, which led to the first map of the high country.

In the 1930s, the Mission Mountains were considered for inclusion in a proposed national park in the area south of Glacier National Park. Ronan Commercial Club president J. L. Jones wrote to the National Park Service director in support of the idea, "We suggest, Mr. Albright, that you add to your already splendid services the inclusion of the Mission Range of mountains... Truly we possess here not the 'garden of Eden,' but that being lost only in myth and tradition we have a most fitting substitute 'The Garden of the Rockies.'" The park service sent a team to study the region during the summer of 1937, but in the end they rejected the proposal, writing, "the Flathead would be of special value in the National Park system if this section were not already fairly well represented by Glacier Park."

The first major protective action for the Mission Range came on October 21, 1931 when 67,000 acres of land along the east side of the Mission Divide were classified as the Mission Mountains Primitive Area. The Great Pacific Railway Company owned 30 percent of this land at the time of the classification, which was exchanged over the course of years for other land in the Flathead National Forest.

Further stories about the Mission Mountains and the surrounding area can be found in the book, In the Shadows of the Missions.

== Hiking and Recreation ==
As most of the Mission Mountains fall under special protection, land use is limited largely to recreation.

The best time to hike in the Mission Mountains is between the beginning of July and October. Winter ends late in the high country and even in the beginning of July hikers will often find high passes and lakes snow-covered and wet. Snow starts to fly as early as October and hiking season is over by the end of the month. Winter recreation is best in the spring months. June is wet, but between February and May one can do some great winter camping, snowshoeing and skiing.

The terrain, especially in the south, is very steep and trails are not always kept clear. The 1.5-billion-year-old mudstone is very brittle and not a reliable handhold. In the daytime it can be very hot, but nights are cold as well.

Because the range is a protected wilderness area, motorized trail bikes, motorcycles, three- and four-wheelers, snowmobiles, hang-gliders and mountain bikes are not permitted.

The range has about 45 miles of official trails. Trails are often cut through the rougher terrain. People wishing to take horses into the range need to consult the Flathead National Forest requirements, which include hay restrictions and other rules.

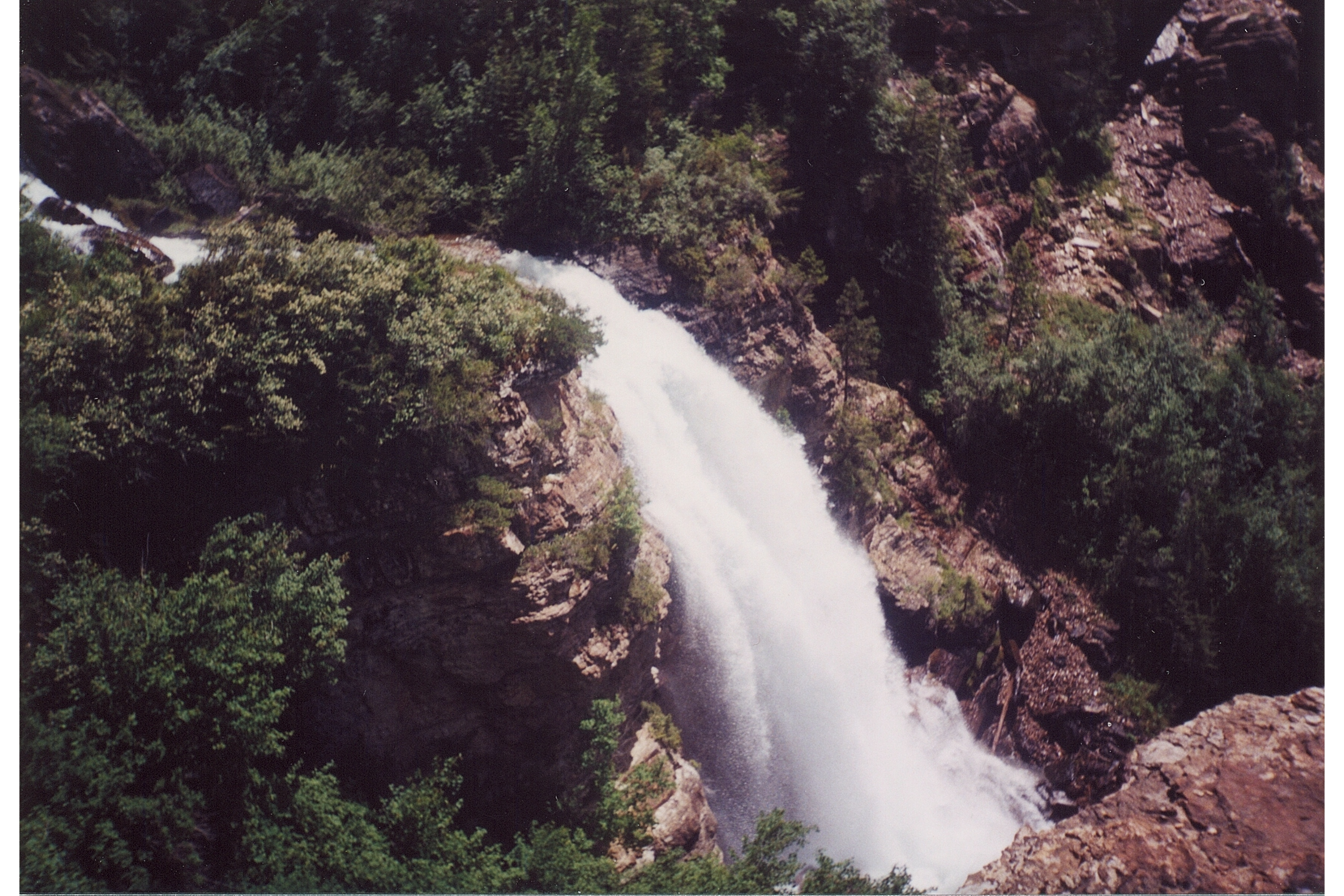
Several spectacular waterfalls grace the western slope of the Missions, in the Tribal Wilderness

Non-tribal members passing through land belonging to the Confederated Salish and Kootenai Tribes are required to carry a valid tribal lands-usage permit, which can easily be obtained at local sporting goods stores. The pass is good for one year and allows access to the east side of the Mission Range, stretches of the Flathead River, and other areas.

== Protected Areas ==
The Mission Mountains have several overlapping protection areas. Much of the Mission Mountain Range is within the Flathead Indian Reservation and under the management of the Confederated Salish and Kootenai Tribes of the Flathead Nation.

Most of the range is also part of the Flathead National Forest, under which the Mission Mountains Wilderness is designated as a wilderness area. The wilderness area is in the Swan Lake Ranger District. The 73,877-acre wilderness (29,897 ha) was designation on Jan. 4, 1975 and is managed under the Wilderness Act of 1964.

The southern end of the Mission Mountains includes a large grizzly bear protection area which is usually closed to hikers from July thru September. This allows the bears to feed on lady bugs and cut worms, and attempts to keep bear-human contact to a minimum.

== Ecology ==
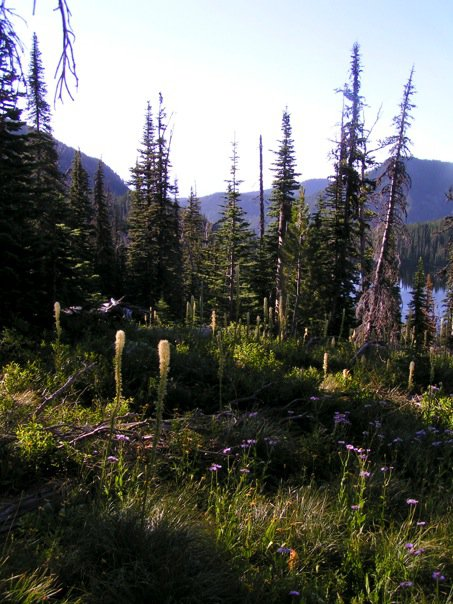
A trailside view, Mission Mountains, north of Rainbow Lake

The Mission Mountains have a wide range of flora and fauna. Mule deer, elk, white-tailed deer, mountain goats, moose, black bears, grizzly bears, coyote, wolverine, lynxes, bobcats and mountain lions have all been spotted in the range. Smaller animals found in the Missions include hoary marmots, yellow-bellied marmots, snowshoe rabbit, pika, chipmunk, squirrel, porcupine, muskrat, badger, skunk, beaver, marten, weasel, and mink.

Western Montana's famous huckleberry is also found all over the slopes of the Mission Mountains in the mid-to-late summer. They are a favorite for hikers and grizzly bears alike.

The most common trees found in the range are the ponderosa pine, western red cedar, douglas fir, western larch, western white pine, lodgepole pine, limber pine, whitebark pine, Engelmann spruce, alpine fir, grand fir, western larch, quaking aspen, alder, and Rocky Mountain maple. Cedars most often grow in the creek bottoms while others are spread throughout the landscape.

Up in the higher reaches of the Mission one finds the alpine larch. Found at elevations of about 6,500 feet-7,000 feet, this tree occurs throughout the range, including along high ridges and near its peaks.

== Notable features ==
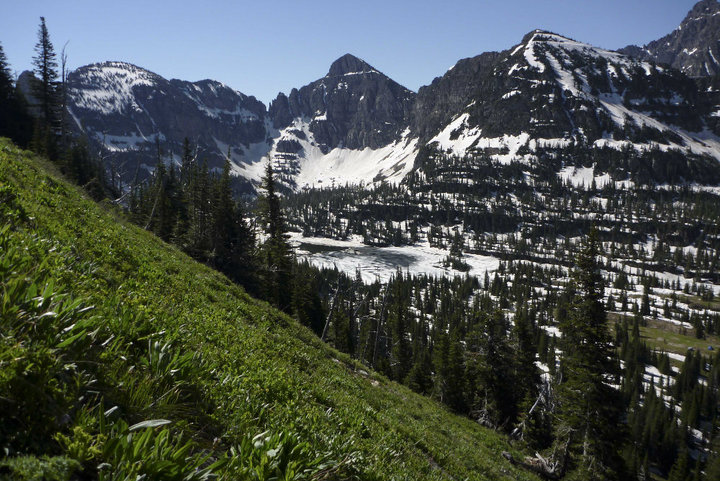
A view of Mullman Lakes in the Mission Mountains in western Montana. Out of the frame, to the right is Mount Calowahcan.

A few major peaks in the Mission Mountains include: Daughter-of-the-Sun Mountain, Flat-Top, Glacier Peak, Gray Wolf Peak, Kakashe Mountain, McDonald Peak, Mount Calowahcan (formally Mt. Harding), Mountaineer Peak, Sonyelm, and West and East St. Mary's Peaks.

Lakes found in the range include: Ashley Lakes, Cold Lakes, Lake of the Stars, Lost Sheep Lake, Lucifer Lake, McDonald Lake (reservoir), Mud Lakes, Mullman Lakes, Rainbow Lake, Schwarz Lake, Summit Lake, and Terrace Lake, among others.

== See also ==
- List of mountain ranges in Montana
