= Glacier Country, Montana =

Region of Montana, United States

Glacier Country, Montana is an eight-county region in the U.S. state of Montana. Glacier Country includes Flathead, Glacier, Lake, Lincoln, Mineral, Missoula, Ravalli and Sanders counties. Glacier Country is home to Glacier National Park, Flathead Lake, the Blackfeet Indian Reservation, Flathead Indian Reservation, 24 state parks, five national forests and Montana's second largest city, Missoula, Montana. As of 2022, the population of Glacier Country was 366,712.

Western Montana’s Glacier Country is the officially recognized destination stewardship organization for the Glacier Country tourism region in the U.S. state of Montana. Along with its in-region partner convention and visitor bureaus (CVBs), the organization is essential to the economic and social well-being of the 75+ communities it represents, driving direct economic impact through the visitor economy and fueling development across the entire economic spectrum by creating familiarity, attracting visitors, sustaining air service and improving quality of life for the people who call this place home.

== Regions ==
=== Flathead County ===
Flathead County is located in the U.S. state of Montana and includes the western side of Glacier National Park as well as the northern half of Flathead Lake and includes land that lies within the Flathead Indian Reservation. As of 2024, the population of Flathead County was 111,814. The main commercial centers for this region are Kalispell and Whitefish. Kalispell is the commercial core for northwest Montana, and has a population of around 28,450 people, making it the second largest city in Glacier Country, Montana. Whitefish is the third largest city in northwest Montana, with 8,915 people. Both cities are served by Glacier Park International Airport.

=== Glacier County ===
Glacier County is located in the U.S. state of Montana between the Great Plains and the Rocky Mountains, part of a region known to the Blackfeet as the "Backbone of the World." Most of the land in the county lies within the Blackfeet Indian Reservation. Glacier County includes the eastern side of Glacier National Park. As of 2024, the population of Glacier County was 13,681. The county is bordered by 75 miles of international boundary with three ports of entry (Roosville, Piegan and Del Bonita) open year-round and one seasonal (Chief Mountain) international border crossing into Alberta, Canada.

=== Lake County ===
Lake County is located in the U.S. state of Montana. As of 2024, the population of Lake County was 32,853. Lake County includes the southern half of Flathead Lake, and over two-thirds of the county’s land lies within the Flathead Indian Reservation.

=== Lincoln County ===
Lincoln County is located in the U.S. state of Montana. As of 2024, the population of Lincoln County was 21,525. Libby, Montana is the county seat of Lincoln County. Libby has a population of 3,097 people.

=== Mineral County ===
Mineral County is located in the U.S. state of Montana. As of 2024, the population of Mineral County was 5,058. Superior, Montana is the county seat of Mineral County and has a population of 918 people.

=== Missoula Country ===
Missoula County is located in the U.S. state of Montana and includes land that lies within the Flathead Indian Reservation (the community of Evaro). As of 2024, the population of Missoula Country was 121,041. Missoula Country includes the city of Missoula, Montana. Missoula is the largest city in all of Western Montana, and the second largest in Montana. As of 2024 the city of Missoula had surpassed 76,000 people. Missoula is the core commercial and shopping hub in all of Western Montana, and is also considered the cultural hub of Western Montana. Missoula is home to the University of Montana, which in 2024 had over 10,000 students. Missoula is served by the Missoula Montana Airport. Missoula has a semi-pro baseball team, the Missoula Paddleheads. Downtown Missoula is a thriving area, and is known as the main shopping district of Western Montana. Missoula's nickname is the Garden City for its dense trees and green landscape, and because Missoula winters are slightly milder than in the rest of the state.

=== Ravalli County ===
Ravalli County is located in the U.S. state of Montana. As of July 2024, the population of Ravalli County was 47,298. Its county seat is Hamilton. Ravalli County is part of a north/south mountain valley bordered by the Sapphire Mountains on the East and the Bitterroot Mountains on the West. It is often referred to as the Bitterroot Valley, named for the Bitterroot Flower.

=== Sanders County ===
Sanders County is located in the U.S. state of Montana and includes land that lies within the Flathead Indian Reservation. As of July 2024, the population of Sanders County was 12,442. Thompson Falls, Montana is the county seat of Sanders County and has a population of 1,447.

== See also ==
- List of counties in Montana
- Glacier County, Montana
