= Ecological systems of Montana =

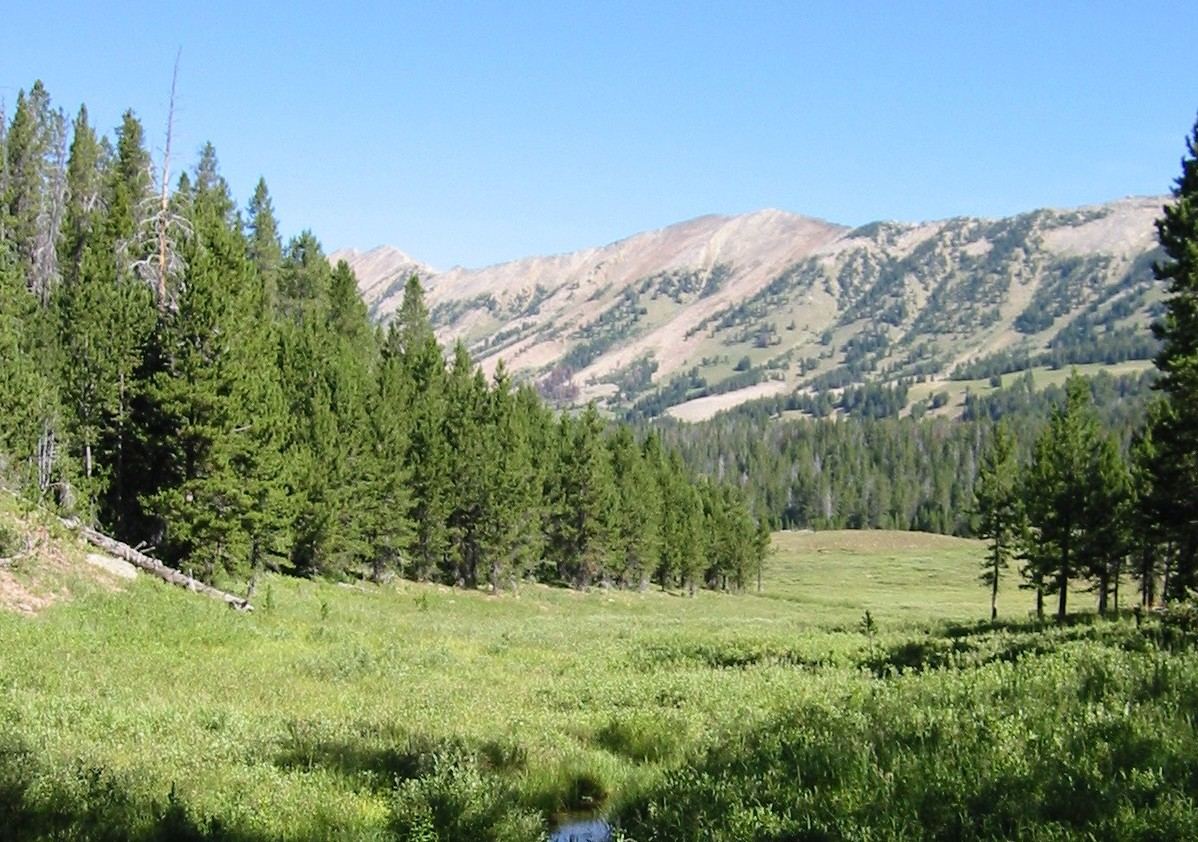
Multiple ecosystems in Gallatin National Forest

There are 62 named ecological systems of Montana described in the Montana Field Guides.

== Definition ==
An ecosystem is a biological environment consisting of all the organisms living in a particular area, as well as all the nonliving, physical components of the environment with which the organisms interact, such as air, soil, water and sunlight. It is all the organisms in a given area, along with the nonliving (abiotic) factors with which they interact; a biological community and its physical environment.

As stated in an article from Montana State University in its Institute on Ecosystems: "An ecosystem can be small, such as the area under a pine tree or a single hot spring in Yellowstone National Park, or it can be large, such as the Rocky Mountains, the rainforest or the Antarctic Ocean."

The Montana Fish, Wildlife and Parks called the state's main ecosystems montane forest, intermountain grassland, plains grassland and shrub grassland. The Montana Agricultural Experiment Station categorized Montana's ecosystems based on the different rangelands and recognized 22 different ecosystems; the Montana Natural Heritage Program recognizes 62 for the entire state.

== Forest and woodland ==
- Northern Rocky Mountain Mesic Montane Mixed Conifer Forest
- Rocky Mountain Subalpine Mesic Spruce-Fir Forest and Woodland
- Northwestern Great Plains - Black Hills Ponderosa Pine Woodland and Savanna
- Northern Rocky Mountain Dry-Mesic Montane Mixed Conifer Forest
- Rocky Mountain Foothill Limber Pine - Juniper Woodland
- Northern Rocky Mountain Foothill Conifer Wooded Steppe
- Rocky Mountain Lodgepole Pine Forest
- Middle Rocky Mountain Montane Douglas-Fir Forest and Woodland
- Northern Rocky Mountain Ponderosa Pine Woodland and Savanna
- Rocky Mountain Poor Site Lodgepole Pine Forest
- Rocky Mountain Subalpine Dry-Mesic Spruce-Fir Forest and Woodland
- Northern Rocky Mountain Subalpine Woodland and Parkland
- Rocky Mountain Aspen Forest and Woodland
- Western Great Plains Wooded Draw and Ravine
- Inter-Mountain Basins Mountain Mahogany Woodland and Shrubland
- Inter-Mountain Basins Aspen Mixed Conifer Forest-Woodland

== Alpine ==
- Rocky Mountain Alpine Dwarf-Shrubland
- Rocky Mountain Alpine Turf
- Rocky Mountain Alpine Bedrock and Scree
- Rocky Mountain Alpine Fell-Field
- North American Alpine Ice Field

== Shrubland, steppe and savanna ==
- Northwestern Great Plains Shrubland
- Rocky Mountain Lower Montane-Foothill Shrubland
- Northern Rocky Mountain Montane-Foothill Deciduous Shrubland
- Northern Rocky Mountain Subalpine Deciduous Shrubland
- Inter-Mountain Basins Big Sagebrush Steppe
- Inter-Mountain Basins Montane Sagebrush Steppe
- Inter-Mountain Basins Big Sagebrush Shrubland
- Wyoming Basins Dwarf Sagebrush Shrubland and Steppe
- Inter-Mountain Basins Mat Saltbush Shrubland
- Inter-Mountain Basins Mixed Salt Desert Scrub

== Grassland ==
- Northwestern Great Plains Mixedgrass Prairie
- Western Great Plains Sand Prairie
- Northern Rocky Mountain Lower Montane, Foothill and Valley Grassland
- Rocky Mountain Subalpine-Montane Mesic Meadow
- Northern Rocky Mountain Subalpine-Upper Montane Grassland

== Sparse and barren ==
- Inter-Mountain Basins Active and Stabilized Dune
- Western Great Plains Badlands
- Inter-Mountain Basins Shale Badland
- Western Great Plains Cliff and Outcrop
- Rocky Mountain Cliff, Canyon and Massive Bedrock
- Inter-Mountain Basins Cliff and Canyon

== Open-water and riparian ==
- Rocky Mountain Subalpine-Montane Fen
- Western Great Plains Closed Depressional Wetland
- Western Great Plains Open Freshwater Depression Wetland
- Great Plains Prairie Pothole
- Western Great Plains Saline Depression Wetland
- Northern Rocky Mountain Wooded Vernal Pool
- Inter-Mountain Basins Greasewood Flat
- Northwestern Great Plains Floodplain
- Northwestern Great Plains Riparian
- Northern Rocky Mountain Lower Montane Riparian Woodland and Shrubland
- Rocky Mountain Lower Montane-Foothill Riparian Woodland and Shrubland
- Rocky Mountain Subalpine-Montane Riparian Shrubland
- Rocky Mountain Subalpine-Montane Riparian Woodland
- Northern Rocky Mountain Conifer Swamp
- North American Arid West
- Geysers and Hot Springs
- Open Water
- Rocky Mountain Alpine-Montane Wet Meadow

== See also ==
- Greater Yellowstone Ecosystem
