= Mission Mountains Wilderness =

Wilderness area in Montana, United States

- IUCN category Ib (wilderness area)
- Location within the United States
- Location: Missoula / Lake counties, Montana, USA
- Nearest city: Missoula, MT
- Coordinates: 47°28′N 113°50′W
- Area: 73,877 acres (298.97 km^{2})
- Established: 1975
- Governing body: U.S. Forest Service

The Mission Mountains Wilderness is located in the U.S. state of Montana. Created by an act of Congress in 1975, the wilderness is within the Swan Lake Ranger District of the Flathead National Forest.

U.S. Wilderness Areas do not allow motorized or mechanized vehicles, including bicycles. Although camping and fishing are allowed with proper permit, no roads or buildings are constructed and there is also no logging or mining, in compliance with the 1964 Wilderness Act. Wilderness areas within National Forests and Bureau of Land Management areas also allow hunting in season.

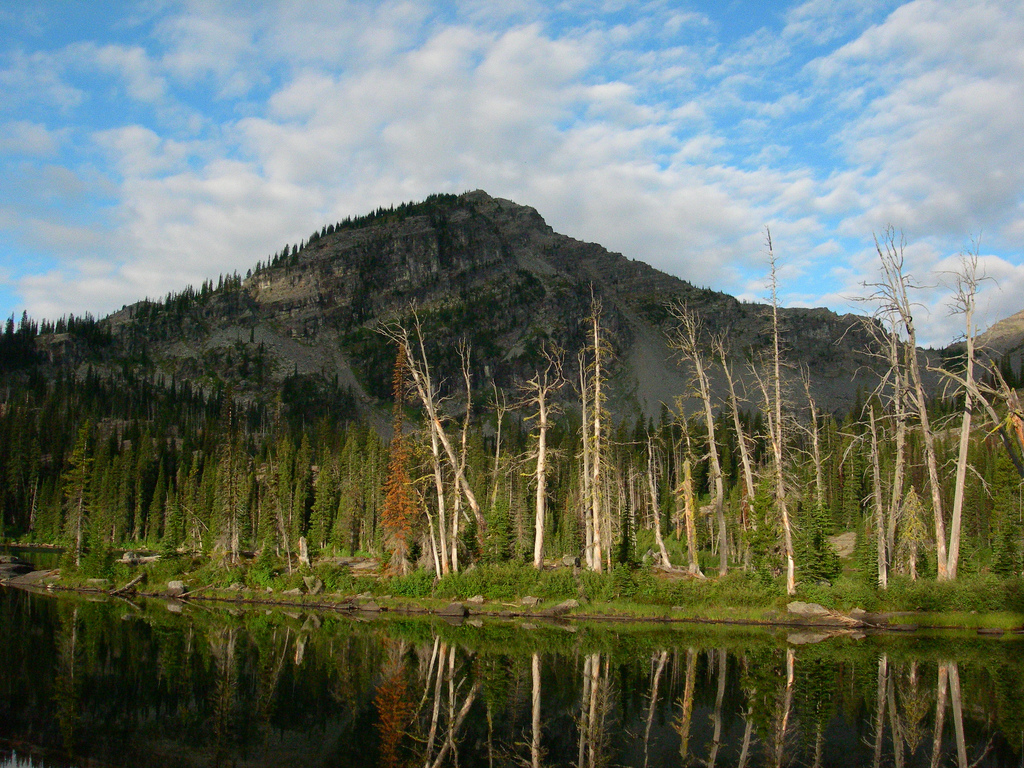
Ducharme Lake

The wilderness can be reached by trail from surrounding roads. Primary access is via Montana highway 83 and logging roads to the east, but there are several western routes leading from the Confederated Salish and Kootenai Tribe's adjoining Mission Mountains Tribal Wilderness. The wilderness is approximately 80 miles (128 km) north of Missoula, Montana and 65 miles (105 km) south-east of Kalispell, Montana.
