= Willard, Montana =

- Unincorporated community
- Location within Montana Location within the United States
- Coordinates: 46°11′38″N 104°22′12″W
- Country: United States
- State: Montana
- County: Fallon
- Elevation: 3,314 ft (1,010 m)
- Time zone: UTC-7 (Mountain (MST))
  - Summer (DST): UTC-6 (MDT)
- ZIP code: 59354
- Area code: 406
- GNIS feature ID: 778507

Willard is an unincorporated community in Fallon County, Montana, United States. Willard is located on Montana Highway 7, 13 miles (21 km) south-southwest of Baker. The community had a post office until September 9, 1995; it still has its own ZIP code, 59354.

The post office was established in 1910 on the stage road between Baker and Ekalaka.
