= Nunberg =

Surname list

Nunberg is a surname. Notable people with the surname include:

- Geoffrey Nunberg, American linguist
- Hermann Nunberg (1884–1970), psychoanalyst and neurologist born in Będzin, Poland
- Sam Nunberg, political advisor to Donald Trump's 2016 presidential campaign

== See also ==
- Vogt–Nunberg Farm, a Wibaux, Montana National Register of Historic Places site
- Nürburg
- Nuremberg
- Nürnberg
