= List of mountains in Fallon County, Montana =

There are at least 16 named mountains in Fallon County, Montana.

- Antelope Butte, 46°26′25″N 104°17′34″W, el. 3,186 feet (971 m)
- Bearhorn Butte, 46°12′31″N 104°24′10″W, el. 3,553 feet (1,083 m)
- Bracket Butte, 46°16′14″N 104°13′31″W, el. 3,409 feet (1,039 m)
- Cap Rock, 46°37′56″N 104°19′22″W, el. 3,222 feet (982 m)
- Cedar Butte, 46°27′19″N 104°08′57″W, el. 3,294 feet (1,004 m)
- Grassy Butte, 46°28′24″N 104°08′37″W, el. 3,409 feet (1,039 m)
- Harmon Butte, 46°14′28″N 104°44′41″W, el. 2,917 feet (889 m)
- Haystack Butte, 46°27′16″N 104°04′00″W, el. 3,117 feet (950 m)
- Monument Butte, 45°58′59″N 104°02′49″W, el. 3,179 feet (969 m)
- Morris Butte, 46°24′52″N 104°09′54″W, el. 3,314 feet (1,010 m)
- Nelson Butte, 46°14′49″N 104°52′10″W, el. 3,123 feet (952 m)
- Rocking Chair Butte, 46°40′45″N 104°26′15″W, el. 2,910 feet (890 m)
- Seven-up Butte, 46°10′54″N 104°32′10″W, el. 3,491 feet (1,064 m)
- Shell Butte, 46°37′05″N 104°14′26″W, el. 3,369 feet (1,027 m)
- Snider Hill, 45°56′36″N 104°02′59″W, el. 3,159 feet (963 m)
- Twin Buttes, 46°22′54″N 104°46′22″W, el. 2,897 feet (883 m)

== See also ==
- List of mountains in Montana
- List of mountain ranges in Montana
