= Roubaix (disambiguation) =

Roubaix is a city in northern France.

Roubaix may also refer to:

== Places ==
- Roubaix, South Dakota

== People ==
- François de Roubaix, a French film score composer

== Films ==
- Oh Mercy! (French: Roubaix, une lumière), a 2019 French crime drama film

== Sport ==
- RC Roubaix, a French association football team
