= KJJM =

- Baker, Montana; United States
- Frequency: 100.5 MHz
- Branding: The Rock

Programming
- Format: Classic rock

Ownership
- Owner: Jay B. Newell; (Newell Media, LLC)
- Sister stations: KFLN

History
- First air date: 2001

Technical information
- Licensing authority: FCC
- Facility ID: 88802
- Class: C3
- ERP: 7,400 watts
- HAAT: 186 meters (610 ft)
- Transmitter coordinates: 46°30′20″N 104°12′36″W

Links
- Public license information: Public file; LMS
- Website: www.radiobaker.com/kjjm/

KJJM (100.5 FM, "The Rock") is a radio station licensed to serve Baker, Montana. The station is owned by Jay B. Newell, through licensee Newell Media, LLC. It airs a classic rock music format.

The station shares studios with sister KFLN, at 3584 Highway 7, north of Baker, Montana. The transmitter and tower is located farther north on Highway 7. The station has listeners in the surrounding area including Glendive, Wibaux, Bowman, Plevna, and Ekalaka.

It began broadcasting in 2001 and has had a live morning show hosted since then by Vaughn Zenko. With the launch of the station, several former DJs appeared using alternate names inspired by Scooby-Doo including "Daphne Blake", "Freddy Jones", and "Shaggy Rogers" as well as another male, and previous co-host of the morning show, referred to as "The Most Hated Man in Baker". The station occasionally airs play-by-play of local high school sports.

The station was assigned the KJJM call letters by the Federal Communications Commission on May 11, 1998.
