= KFLN =

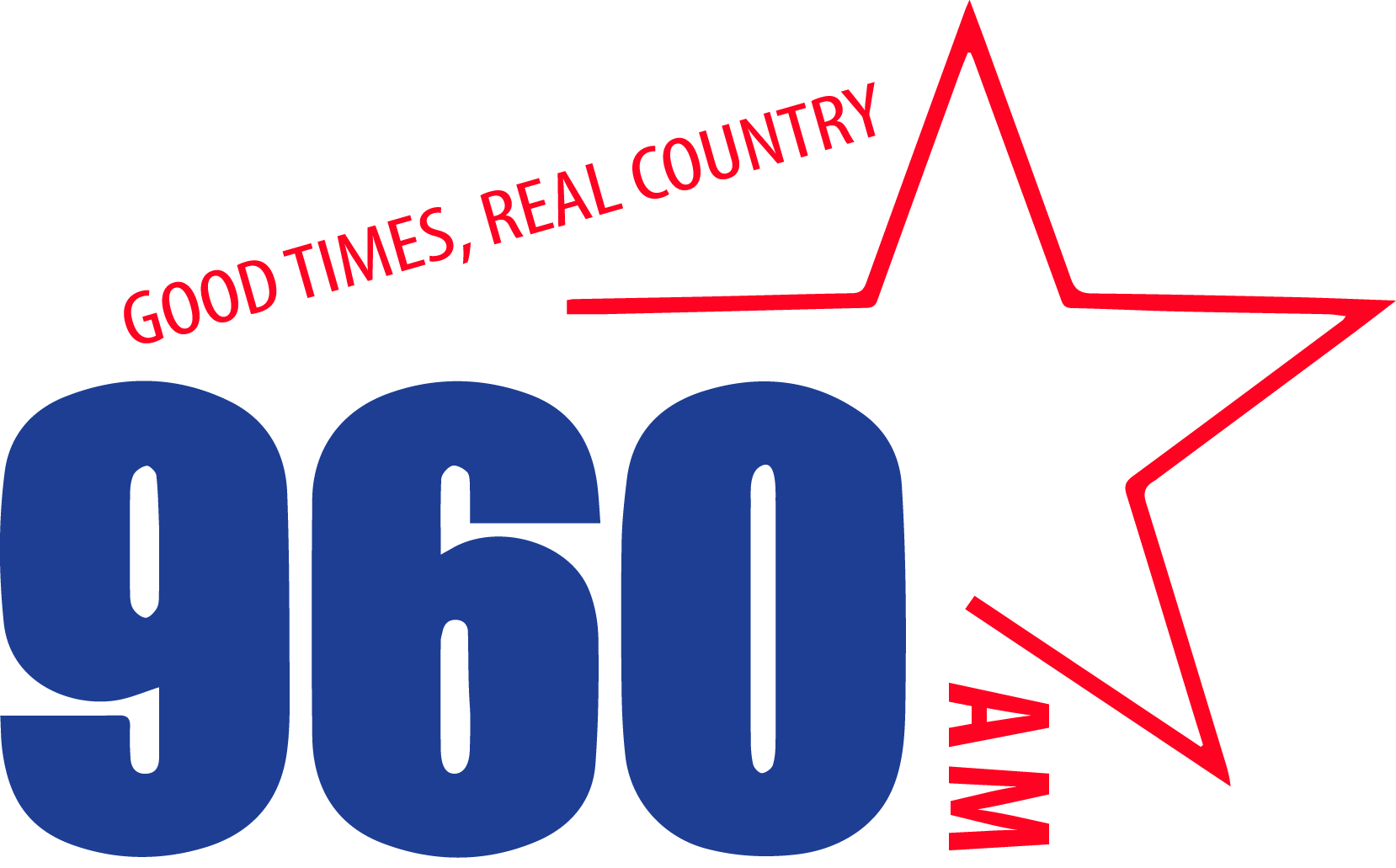
- Baker, Montana; United States
- Broadcast area: Eastern Montana
- Frequency: 960 kHz
- Branding: 960 KFLN

Programming
- Format: Country

Ownership
- Owner: Jay B. Newell; (Newell Media, LLC)
- Sister stations: KJJM

History
- Call sign meaning: Fallon County

Technical information
- Licensing authority: FCC
- Facility ID: 48734
- Class: D
- Power: 5,000 watts (day); 91 watts (night)
- Transmitter coordinates: 46°22′31″N 104°16′29″W
- Translator: 98.7 K254DO (Baker)

Links
- Public license information: Public file; LMS
- Website: www.radiobaker.com

KFLN (960 AM, "960 KFLN") is a radio station licensed to serve Baker, Montana. The station is owned by Jay B. Newell, through licensee Newell Media, LLC. It airs a country music format.

The station shares studios with sister KJJM on Highway 7 north of Baker, Montana. The transmitter is also here.

The station was assigned the KFLN call letters by the Federal Communications Commission.
