= St. Peter's Catholic Church (Wibaux, Montana) =

Historic church in Montana, United States

- U.S. National Register of Historic Places
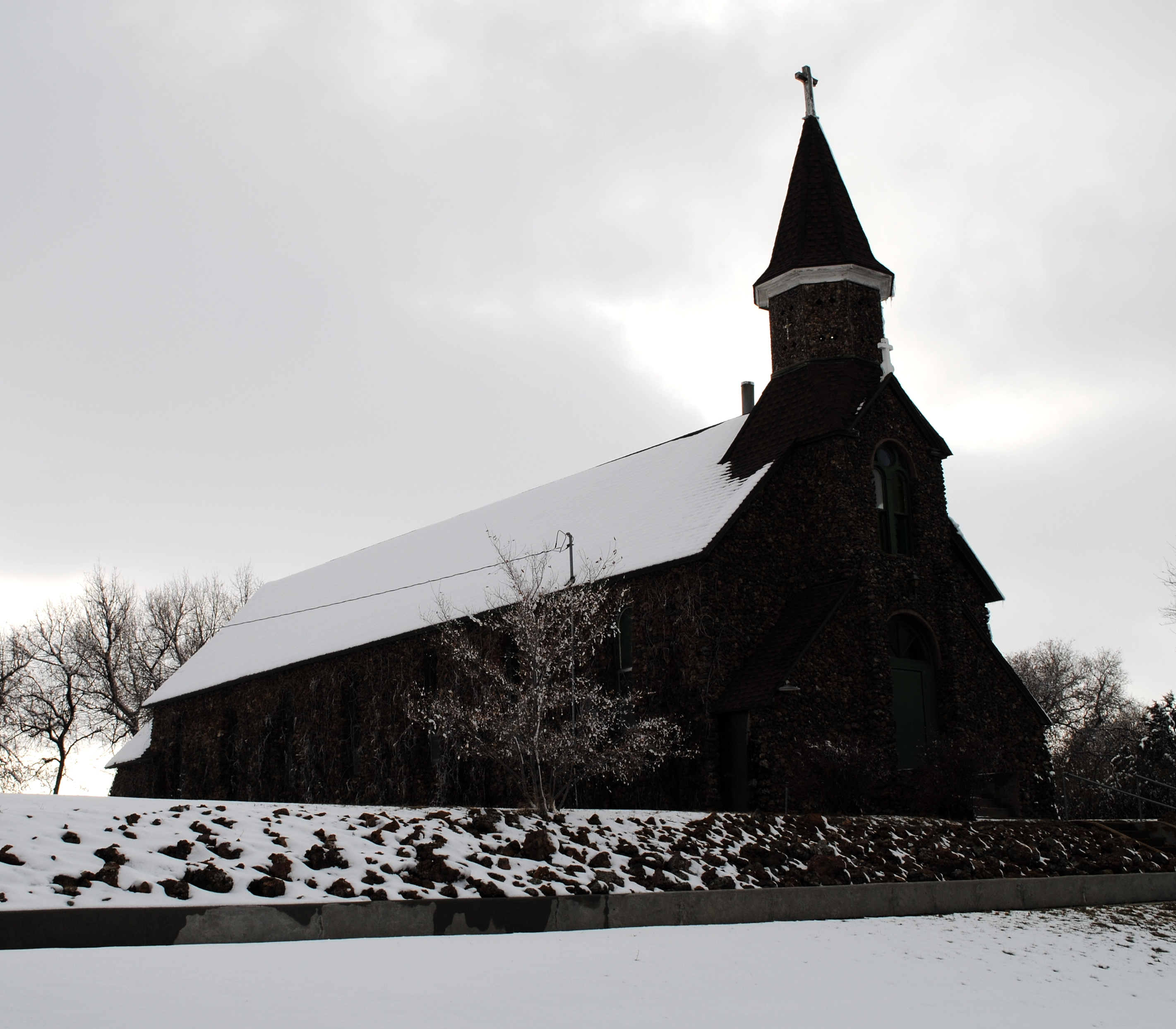

- Location within Montana Location within the United States
- Location: W. Orgain Ave
- Coordinates: 46°59′14″N 104°11′28″W
- Architect: Nistler, L., Cummings & Blias
- Architectural style: Gothic Revival
- NRHP reference No.: 90000356
- Added to NRHP: March 14, 1990

St. Peter's Catholic Church is a site on the National Register of Historic Places located in Wibaux, Montana. It was added to the Register on March 14, 1990.

== Description ==
An inscription on the original stained-glass window in the sacristy reads: "Through the generosity of Pierre Wibaux this church was dedicated to St. Peter in 1895."

For the centennial celebration of the Roman Catholic Diocese of Great Falls-Billings in 2004, a photo catalogue of parishes was published, containing comments about the old St. Peter's Church.

Several years later the building ceased to be used for catechesis, and the nave and sanctuary have since been restored to their original form. Those who wish to visit the interior may contact the Wibaux Historical Society.
