= Shann Schillinger =

American football player and coach (born 1986)

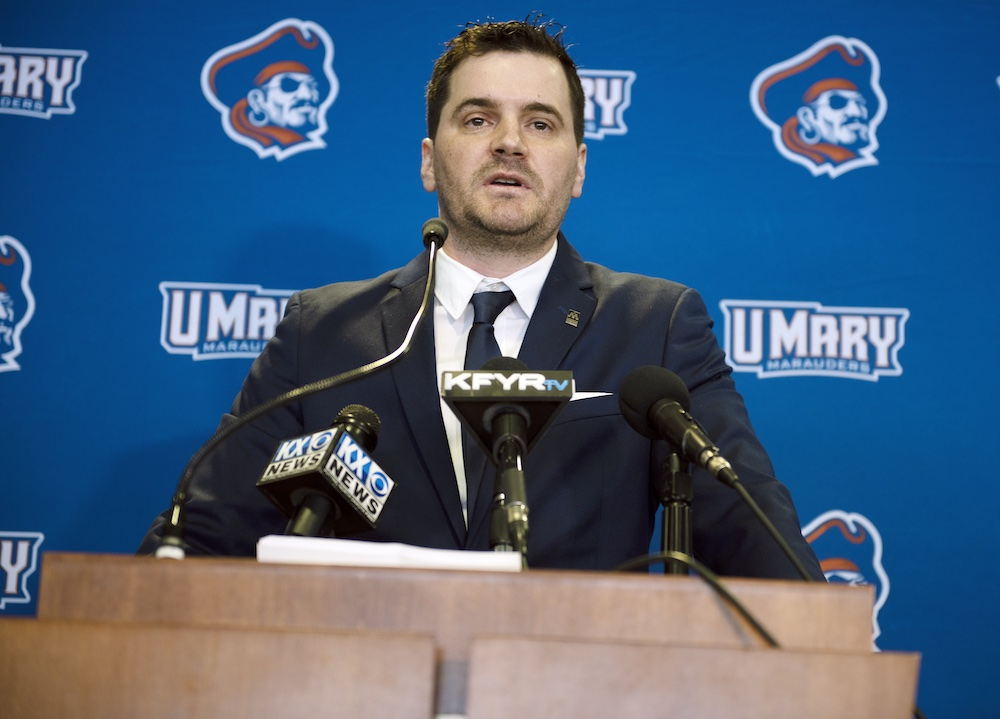
- Schillinger at University of Mary press conference

Mary Marauders
- Title: Head coach

Personal information
- Born: May 22, 1986 (age 40); Baker, Montana, U.S.
- Listed height: 6 ft 0 in (1.83 m)
- Listed weight: 199 lb (90 kg)

Career information
- High school: Baker (MT)
- College: Montana
- NFL draft: 2010: 6th round, 171st overall pick

Career history

Playing
- Atlanta Falcons (2010–2013); Tennessee Titans (2013)

Coaching
- Dickinson State (2014) Special teams coordinator & wide receivers coach; Nebraska (2015) Assistant special teams coordinator; Montana (2016–2021) Safeties coach; Mississippi State (2022) Defensive analyst; Mary (2023–present) Head coach

Awards and highlights
- First-team All-Big Sky (2009); Second-team All-Big Sky (2008); Tony Barbour Award

Career NFL statistics
- Total tackles: 19
- Stats at Pro Football Reference

Head coaching record
- Career: 11–33 (.250)

Shann Schillinger (born May 22, 1986) is an American college football coach and former player. He is the head football coach for the University of Mary, a position he has held since 2023. He previously coached for Dickinson State, Nebraska, Montana, and Mississippi State. He played college football for Montana as a linebacker and was selected in the sixth round of the 2010 NFL draft by the Atlanta Falcons of the National Football League (NFL). He also played for the Tennessee Titans.

== Early life ==
Schillinger attended Baker High School, where he was a four-year letterman in football, and his varsity teams had an overall record of 49–1. He was a two-time all-state selection. As a senior, he passed for 1,059 yards and 15 touchdowns and rushed for 650 yards and 14 touchdowns. He was a team captain for the East (along with Grizzly teammate Shawn Lebsock) in Montana's annual East-West Shrine Game. He also played in the Badlands Bowl (Montana-North Dakota All-Star Game). He also lettered four times in both basketball and track.

== College career ==
Schillinger played college football at Montana. During his freshman year, Schillinger was forced to redshirt because of a leg injury, but played in all 14 games in 2006 and 2007 as a backup. He started all 16 games in 2008, tying for the team lead with four interceptions and two forced fumbles to be named second-team All-Big Sky. He earned the Tony Barbour Award as the player which best exemplifies Grizzly football. He had 90 tackles and started every game as a senior, when he was named All-Big Sky, first-team. Schillinger wasn't invited to the NFL Scouting Combine but did participate in the Texas vs The Nation showcase.

== Professional career ==
=== Atlanta Falcons ===
Schillinger was selected by the Atlanta Falcons in the sixth round (171st overall) of the 2010 NFL draft. On June 6, 2010, the Atlanta Falcons signed Schillinger to a four-year contract.

=== Tennessee Titans ===
Schillinger was signed by the Tennessee Titans on November 27, 2013. After playing in one game for the team, Schillinger was released by the Titans on December 3, 2013.

== Coaching career ==
After retiring from the NFL, Schillinger became a wide receivers and special team coach at Dickinson State University in 2014. A year later, he went to University of Nebraska–Lincoln as an assistant coach. He returned his alma mater, Montana; in 2016 as safeties coach. In 2022, he became a defensive analyst at Mississippi State University. Currently, he is the head football coach at the University of Mary in Bismarck, North Dakota.

== Personal life ==
Schillinger was born and raised in Baker, MT. He earned his degree from the University of Montana in 2010. He currently lives with his wife and children in Bismarck, ND.

== Head coaching record ==
Year	Team	Overall	Conference	Standing	Bowl/playoffs
Mary Marauders (Northern Sun Intercollegiate Conference) (2023–present)
2023	Mary	2–9	2–8	T–10th	
2024	Mary	2–9	1–9	12th	
2025	Mary	4–7	3–7 / 2–4	T–10th / 6th (North)	
2026	Mary	3–8	2–8 / 1–5	12th / 6th (North)	
Mary:		11–33	8–32		
Total:		11–33			
