= Baker Municipal Airport =

Airport in Montana, United States

- IATA: none; ICAO: KBHK; FAA LID: BHK

Summary
- Airport type: Public
- Owner: Baker City & Fallon County
- Serves: Baker, Montana
- Elevation AMSL: 2,975 ft (907 m)
- Coordinates: 46°20′52″N 104°15′34″W
- Interactive map of Baker Municipal Airport

Runways
Direction	Length		Surface
Direction	ft	m	Surface
13/31	4,898	1,493	Asphalt

Statistics (2010)
- Aircraft operations: 7,050
- Based aircraft: 23
- Source: Federal Aviation Administration

Baker Municipal Airport (ICAO: KBHK, FAA LID: BHK) is a public-use airport located one nautical mile (1.2 mi; 1.9 km) southeast of the central business district of Baker, a city in Fallon County, Montana, United States. The airport is owned by Baker City and Fallon County. It is included in the FAA's National Plan of Integrated Airport Systems for 2011–2015, which categorized it as a general aviation facility.

Although many U.S. airports use the same three-letter location identifier for the FAA and IATA, this facility is assigned BHK by the FAA but has no designation from the IATA (which assigned BHK to Bukhara Airport in Bukhara, Uzbekistan).

== Facilities and aircraft ==
Baker Municipal Airport covers an area of 193 acres (78 ha) at an elevation of 2,975 feet (907 m) above mean sea level. It has one runway designated 13/31 with an asphalt surface measuring 4,898 by 75 feet (1,493 by 23 m).

For the 12-month period ending September 1, 2010, the airport had 7,050 aircraft operations, an average of 19 per day: 95% general aviation, 4% air taxi, and 1% military. At that time there were 23 aircraft based at this airport: 87% single-engine, 9% multi-engine and 4% helicopter.
