= Wibaux Commercial Historic District =

Historic district in Montana, United States

- U.S. National Register of Historic Places
- U.S. Historic district
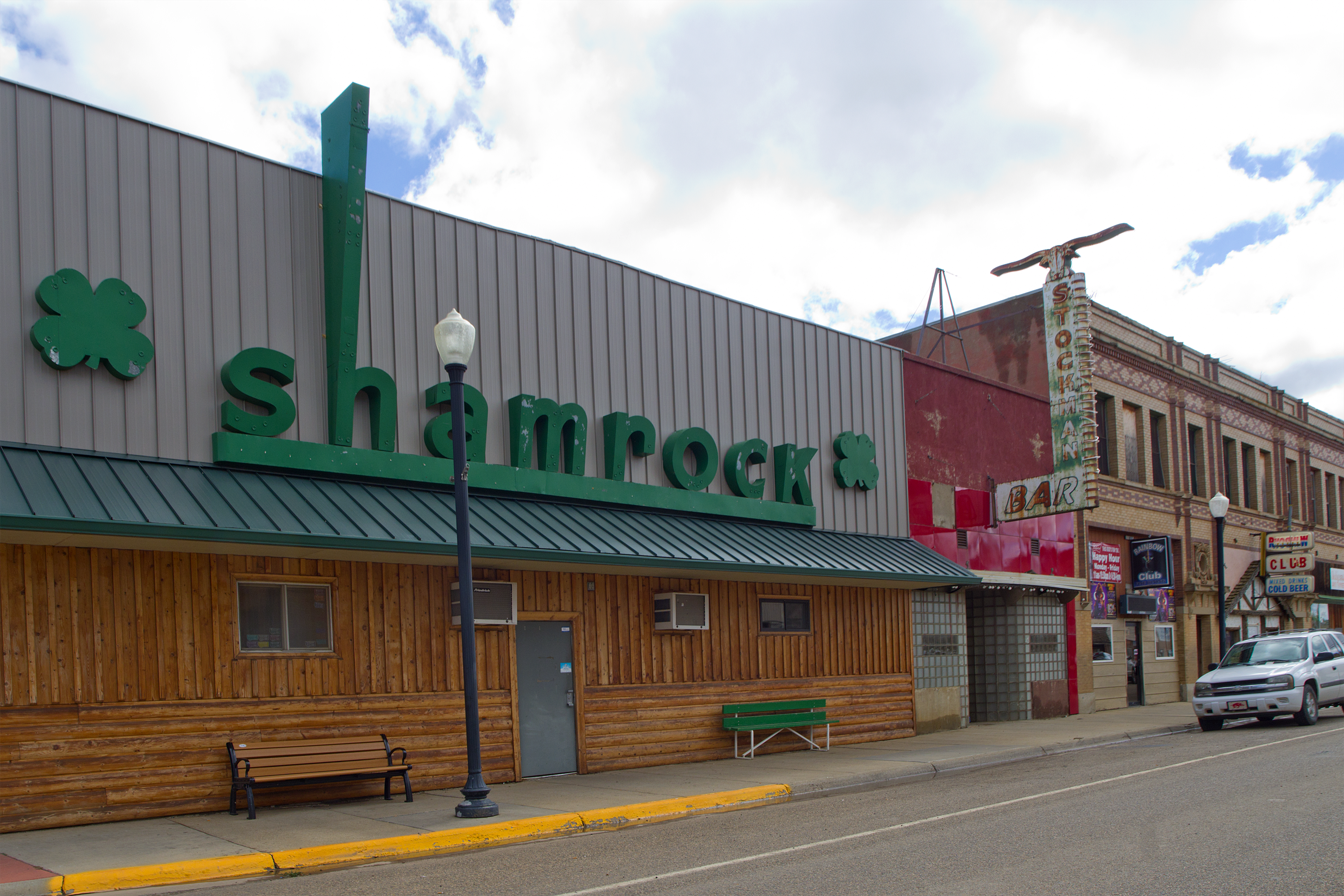

- Location within Montana Location within the United States
- Location: Roughly bounded by W. Orgain Ave., Wibaux, E. 1st Ave., S., and E, Wibaux, Montana
- Coordinates: 46°59′11″N 104°11′15″W
- Area: 4.5 acres (1.8 ha)
- Built: 1905
- Built by: Multiple
- Architectural style: Chicago, Late Victorian, Western Commercial
- NRHP reference No.: 89002170
- Added to NRHP: December 28, 1989

The Wibaux Commercial Historic District is a site on the National Register of Historic Places located in Wibaux, Montana. It was added to the Register on December 28, 1989. It then included 12 contributing buildings.

== Chappell Block (109 Wibaux Street South) ==
Prominent resident Stephen B. Chappell was the main financial contributor and owner of this edifice constructed in 1911. The building combines two structures that are unified by a single façade treatment. The Chappell Hotel, First State Bank, and a grocery store were the original occupants. Colorful brickwork and architectural ornamentation above the two main entries provide an example of early-twentieth-century architecture in a small western town.

== Clark Hardware Company (110 South Wibaux Street) ==
Harold G. Clark and Orlando Burgess, owners of the Clark Hardware Company, constructed this one-story brick and stucco commercial building in 1916. Representative of the period of Wibaux's major economic development, it originally housed the hardware store, a funeral parlor, jewelry store, and tailor. Six decorative relief panels ornament the upper portion of the structure. Multicolored brick in a chevron and diamond pattern adorn the space above the center door.

== Kinney Block / First National Bank Building (125 South Wibaux Street) ==
In 1910, J. C. Kinney and other local capitalists created the Wibaux Improvement Company to build this handsome two-story business block. Contractor Charles Charmichael of Miles City constructed the “large and commodious building … faced with a high grade red pressed brick and trimmed with red sandstone” for $33,000. According to the Wibaux Pioneer, the building was “strictly modern, hot water heated and hot and cold water in every suite.” A year later, the Improvement Company installed an electric plant with a six-hundred-light capacity in the basement. In addition to a generator imported from St. Paul, Minnesota, the plant also boasted a “large storage battery,” which supplied “commercial lights early in the mornings, [on] dark afternoons,” and at other times the main plant did not operate. The building's early tenants included a clothing store, drug store, post office, barbershop, and realty and loan company. Kinney was president of First National Bank, and the bank had offices on the second floor. In the 1950s, John Dobrowski converted the building into the Palace Hotel and Cafe, which it remains today.

== Smith Saloon ==
Constructed during Wibaux's transition period from a cattle town into an agricultural center, this Queen Anne commercial style building originally housed the Smith Saloon. Partners William H. Smith, John R. Cornell, and W. H. North built the saloon between 1904 and 1906 and later sold the business to W. H. Rucker, who operated it until 1917 when he sold the property to the State Bank of Yates. Renamed the Wibaux County Bank, it operated out of here until its failure. In 1923, Wibaux County purchased the building for use as the county courthouse and jail. Since 1952, the City Hall and the public library have occupied the space. The Smith Saloon is an excellent example of early-twentieth-century commercial architecture, with front parapet and battlements, corner pilasters, a tiered belt course with modillions, recessed doorway, and a concrete hood with ornamental concrete support brackets. A primary structure in the historic district, the building remains as the best representative of early Wibaux County government.

== Woodburn Building ==
Brothers Burl and William Woodburn collaborated to construct this substantial commercial building in 1917. The Masonic Temple was located on the upper floor and the Woodburn Brothers Grocery occupied the ground space until the building changed hands in 1921. Its striking polychrome brick, gently sloping gable parapets, and terra cotta tile-framed windows and doors add unique contrast to the plain rectangular plan. Numerous T- and diamond-shaped terra cotta medallions ornament the upper level.
