= Yates, Montana =

- Unincorporated community
- Location within the state of Montana Yates, Montana (the United States)
- Coordinates: 46°57′4″N 104°7′50″W
- Country: United States
- State: Montana
- County: Wibaux
- Elevation: 2,772 ft (845 m)
- Time zone: UTC-7 (Mountain (MST))
  - Summer (DST): UTC-6 (MDT)
- ZIP code: 59353
- GNIS feature ID: 802243

Yates is an unincorporated community in Wibaux County, Montana, United States. A post office was established in Yates on December 1, 1908 but was closed on July 15, 1920.
