= Medicine Lake National Wildlife Refuge =

US national wildlife refuge

- IUCN category IV (habitat/species management area)
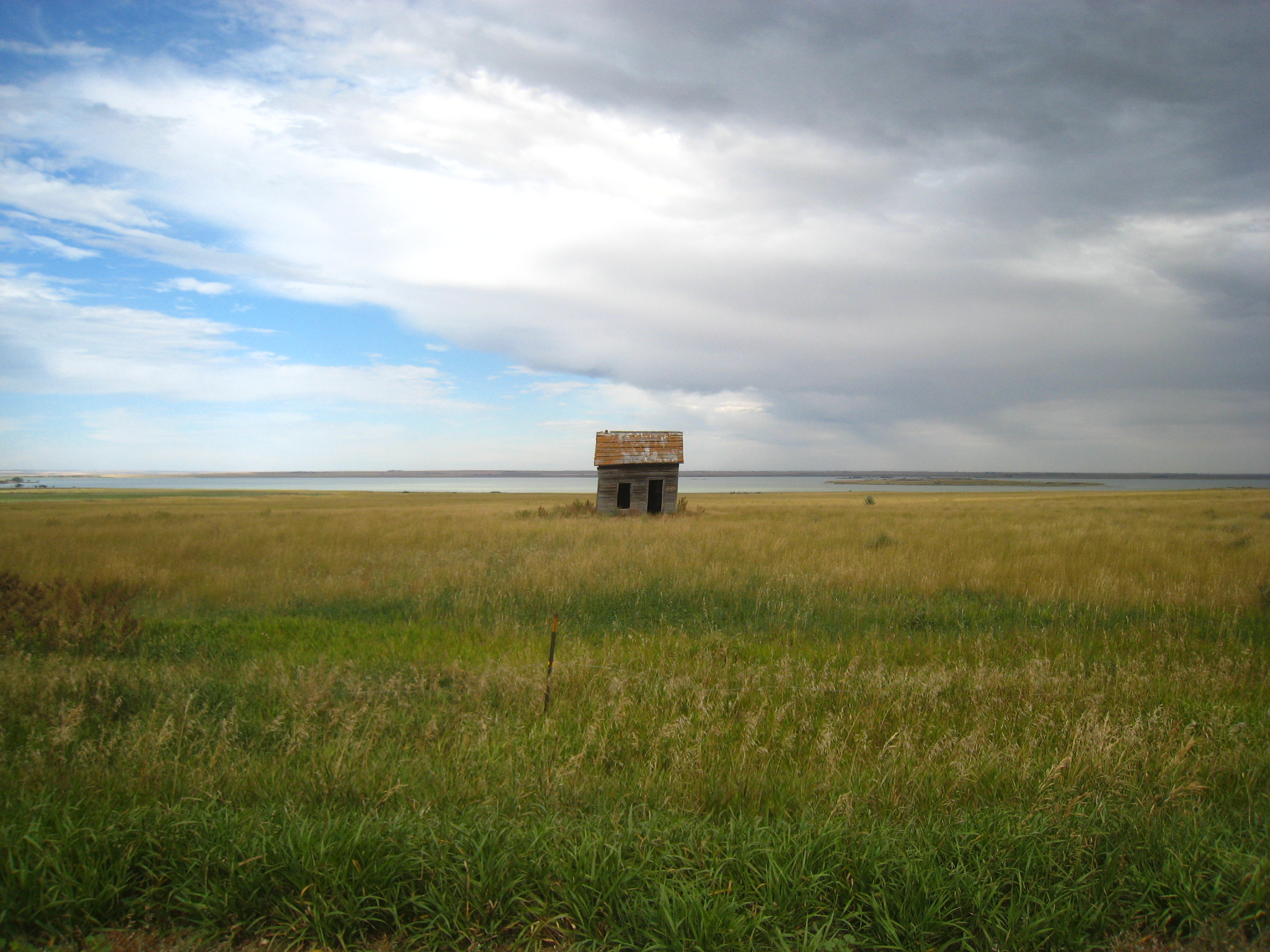

- Location within the United States
- Location: Sheridan County and Roosevelt County, Montana, United States
- Nearest city: Glendive, MT
- Coordinates: 48°28′05″N 104°22′54″W
- Area: 31,533 acres (12,761 ha)
- Established: 1935
- Governing body: U.S. Fish and Wildlife Service
- Website: Medicine Lake National Wildlife Refuge

Medicine Lake National Wildlife Refuge is a 31,533-acre (12,761 ha) National Wildlife Refuge located in the northeastern region of the U.S. state of Montana. The refuge is part of the Medicine Lake National Wildlife Refuge Complex which also includes the Northeast Montana Wetland Management District (WMD) and Lamesteer National Wildlife Refuge. Medicine Lake is from the Assiniboine description of the lake, "Bda wauka" (medicine water). The refuge was established in 1935 to protect habitat for various wildlife and especially migratory birds. The refuge is managed by the U.S. Fish and Wildlife Service, an agency of the U.S. Department of the Interior. In 1980, the Medicine Lake Site was designated as a National Natural Landmark by the National Park Service.

== Fauna ==
283 distinct bird species have been documented and of these 125 are known to nest on the refuge. The fifth largest colony of American white pelicans, representing 4,000 breeding pairs, has been recorded. In 2003, a whooping crane was photographed on the refuge and is the first documented sighting of this endangered species ever in the state of Montana. There are only an estimated 300 whooping cranes believed to be in existence. There is one endangered and two threatened species of birds known to inhabit the refuge at least seasonally. Mammals such as the black bear, wolverine, moose, mule deer, bobcat, caribou and pronghorn can be found here as well.

== Wilderness ==
Medicine Lake Wilderness is a 11,366-acre (4,600 ha) wilderness area within the refuge that was established in 1976 to provide a higher level of protection to the most remote sections of the refuge.
