= Wibaux County, Montana =

County in Montana, United States

- County
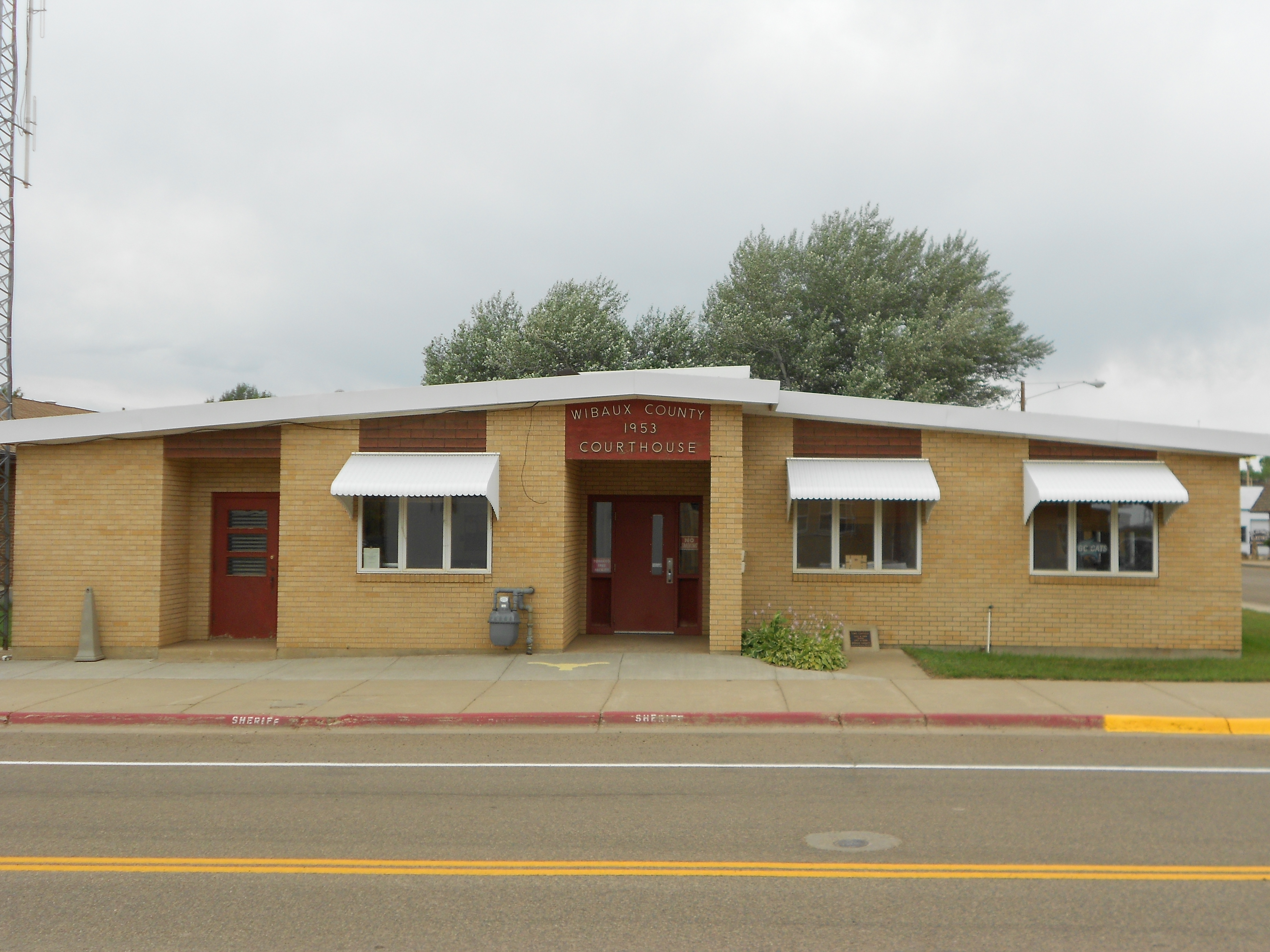
- Wibaux County Courthouse in Wibaux

- Location within the U.S. state of Montana
- Coordinates: 46°58′N 104°15′W
- Country: United States
- State: Montana
- Founded: August 17, 1914
- Named for: Pierre Wibaux
- Seat: Wibaux
- Largest town: Wibaux

Area
  - Total: 890 sq mi (2,300 km^{2})
  - Land: 889 sq mi (2,300 km^{2})
  - Water: 0.7 sq mi (1.8 km^{2}) 0.07%

Population (2020)
  - Total: 937
  - Estimate (2025): 885 ▼
  - Density: 1.05/sq mi (0.407/km^{2})
- Time zone: UTC−7 (Mountain)
  - Summer (DST): UTC−6 (MDT)
- Congressional district: 2nd
- Montana county number 52

Wibaux County (/ˈwiːboʊ/ WEE-boh) is a county in the U.S. state of Montana. As of the 2020 census, the population was 937, making it the fourth-least populous county in Montana. Its county seat is Wibaux.

== History ==
Wibaux County was created by the Montana Legislature in 1914 from parts of Dawson, Fallon, and Richland Counties. The name comes from Pierre Wibaux (1858–1913), a late 19th-century cattle baron and friend of Theodore Roosevelt whose ranch was just over the border (in Dakota Territory, later North Dakota). According to legend, Pierre Wibaux's cowboys surrounded the town of Mingusville, and wouldn't let anyone enter or leave town unless they signed a petition changing the name of the town to Wibaux. Upon his death, his ashes were spread over a hill west of Wibaux. Today, a statue of Pierre Wibaux stands on that hill.

== Geography ==
According to the United States Census Bureau, the county has a total area of 890 square miles (2,300 km^{2}), of which 889 square miles (2,300 km^{2}) is land and 0.7 square miles (1.8 km^{2}) (0.07%) is water. It is the third-smallest county in Montana by land area.

=== Adjacent counties ===
- Richland County – north
- Dawson County – northwest
- Prairie County – west
- Fallon County – south
- Golden Valley County, North Dakota – east
- McKenzie County, North Dakota – northeast

=== Major highways ===
- Interstate 94
- U.S. Highway 10 (Former)
- Montana Highway 7
- S-261

=== National protected area ===
- Lamesteer National Wildlife Refuge

== Demographics ==
Historical population
Census	Pop.	Note	%±
1920	3,113		—
1930	2,767		−11.1%
1940	2,161		−21.9%
1950	1,907		−11.8%
1960	1,698		−11.0%
1970	1,465		−13.7%
1980	1,476		0.8%
1990	1,191		−19.3%
2000	1,068		−10.3%
2010	1,017		−4.8%
2020	937		−7.9%
2025 (est.)	885	▼	−5.5%
U.S. Decennial Census; 1790–1960, 1900–1990, 1990–2000, 2010–2020

=== 2020 census ===
As of the 2020 census, the county had a population of 937. Of the residents, 22.1% were under the age of 18 and 26.4% were 65 years of age or older; the median age was 47.8 years. For every 100 females there were 101.5 males, and for every 100 females age 18 and over there were 98.4 males. 0.0% of residents lived in urban areas and 100.0% lived in rural areas.

The racial makeup of the county was 92.8% White, 0.2% Black or African American, 0.7% American Indian and Alaska Native, 0.2% Asian, 0.6% from some other race, and 5.1% from two or more races. Hispanic or Latino residents of any race comprised 2.9% of the population.

There were 405 households in the county, of which 28.9% had children under the age of 18 living with them and 23.2% had a female householder with no spouse or partner present. About 34.3% of all households were made up of individuals and 18.3% had someone living alone who was 65 years of age or older.

There were 518 housing units, of which 21.8% were vacant. Among occupied housing units, 74.6% were owner-occupied and 25.4% were renter-occupied. The homeowner vacancy rate was 2.2% and the rental vacancy rate was 21.1%.

=== 2010 census ===
As of the 2010 census, there were 1,017 people, 457 households, and 281 families in the county. The population density was 1.1 inhabitants per square mile (0.42/km^{2}). There were 538 housing units at an average density of 0.6 units per square mile (0.23/km^{2}). The racial makeup of the county was 97.6% white, 0.5% Asian, 0.4% American Indian, 0.3% from other races, and 1.2% from two or more races. Those of Hispanic or Latino origin made up 1.3% of the population. In terms of ancestry, 46.3% were German, 13.7% were Polish, 13.4% were Irish, 12.1% were American, 9.5% were English, 8.0% were Norwegian, and 5.3% were Dutch.

Of the 457 households, 24.1% had children under the age of 18 living with them, 50.1% were married couples living together, 6.1% had a female householder with no husband present, 38.5% were non-families, and 35.4% of all households were made up of individuals. The average household size was 2.17 and the average family size was 2.80. The median age was 49.0 years.

The median income for a household in the county was $40,417 and the median income for a family was $51,354. Males had a median income of $43,438 versus $24,821 for females. The per capita income for the county was $22,579. About 7.2% of families and 11.8% of the population were below the poverty line, including 22.7% of those under age 18 and 12.8% of those age 65 or over.

== Politics ==
Wibaux County voters are reliably Republican. Since 1964 they have selected the Democratic Party candidate in only one national election (as of 2020).

United States presidential election results for Wibaux County, Montana
Year	Republican		Democratic		Third party(ies)	
Year	No.	%	No.	%	No.	%
1916	466	42.13%	585	52.89%	55	4.97%
1920	692	71.64%	223	23.08%	51	5.28%
1924	505	56.93%	189	21.31%	193	21.76%
1928	583	56.27%	448	43.24%	5	0.48%
1932	445	35.54%	798	63.74%	9	0.72%
1936	362	31.18%	790	68.04%	9	0.78%
1940	461	44.20%	576	55.23%	6	0.58%
1944	432	50.29%	425	49.48%	2	0.23%
1948	421	46.52%	471	52.04%	13	1.44%
1952	556	62.82%	324	36.61%	5	0.56%
1956	431	52.50%	390	47.50%	0	0.00%
1960	387	48.01%	419	51.99%	0	0.00%
1964	308	41.79%	427	57.94%	2	0.27%
1968	347	52.98%	252	38.47%	56	8.55%
1972	390	55.48%	283	40.26%	30	4.27%
1976	308	44.57%	352	50.94%	31	4.49%
1980	450	61.56%	219	29.96%	62	8.48%
1984	423	64.98%	216	33.18%	12	1.84%
1988	358	56.92%	258	41.02%	13	2.07%
1992	234	38.55%	195	32.13%	178	29.32%
1996	284	46.33%	197	32.14%	132	21.53%
2000	369	71.24%	121	23.36%	28	5.41%
2004	407	72.68%	144	25.71%	9	1.61%
2008	379	67.32%	146	25.93%	38	6.75%
2012	421	77.39%	98	18.01%	25	4.60%
2016	463	85.58%	55	10.17%	23	4.25%
2020	516	86.29%	77	12.88%	5	0.84%
2024	463	84.80%	71	13.00%	12	2.20%

== Communities ==
=== Town ===
- Wibaux (county seat)

=== Unincorporated communities ===
- Carlyle
- St. Phillip
- Yates

== See also ==
- List of lakes in Wibaux County, Montana
- List of mountains in Wibaux County, Montana
- National Register of Historic Places listings in Wibaux County, Montana
