= Lamesteer National Wildlife Refuge =

Easement in Montana, United States

- IUCN category IV (habitat/species management area)
- Location within the United States
- Location: Wibaux County, Montana, USA
- Nearest city: Wibaux, MT
- Coordinates: 46°47′33″N 104°09′17″W
- Area: 800 acres (320 ha)
- Established: May 19, 1942
- Governing body: U.S. Fish and Wildlife Service

Lamesteer National Wildlife Refuge is an 800-acre (320 ha) National Wildlife Refuge in eastern Montana, U.S. All of the acreage is an easement refuge and is on privately owned land but the landowners and U.S. Government work cooperatively to protect the resources. The refuge was set aside to preserve habitat for migratory birds that frequent Lamesteer Reservoir, and the refuge and reservoir are named after Lame Steer Creek. The refuge is unstaffed and is managed from Medicine Lake National Wildlife Refuge.

The 2007 plan for the refuge proposed to remove the refuge from the National Wildlife Refuge System and relinquish the easement to the current landowners.
