= Rocking Chair Butte =

Mountain in the American state of Montana

Coordinates: 46°40′45″N 104°26′15″W

Rocking Chair Butte is a summit in Fallon County, Montana, in the United States. With an elevation of 2,871 feet (875 m), Rocking Chair Butte is the 3124th highest summit in the state of Montana.
