= Pierre Wibaux =

French rancher in Montana (1858-1913)

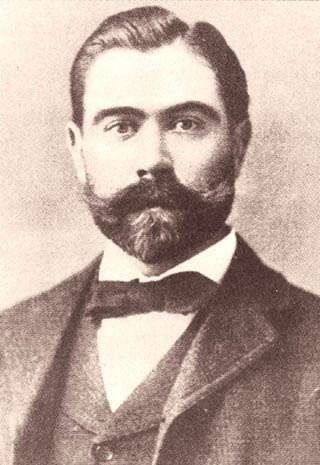
- Born: January 12, 1858; Roubaix, Nord-Pas-de-Calais, France
- Died: March 21, 1913 (aged 55); Chicago, United States
- Occupations: Cattle-Rancher; banker; gold-mine owner
- Spouse: Mary Ellen Cooper
- Children: Cyril Wibaux
- Parent(s): Achille Wibaux, Cécile Vernier

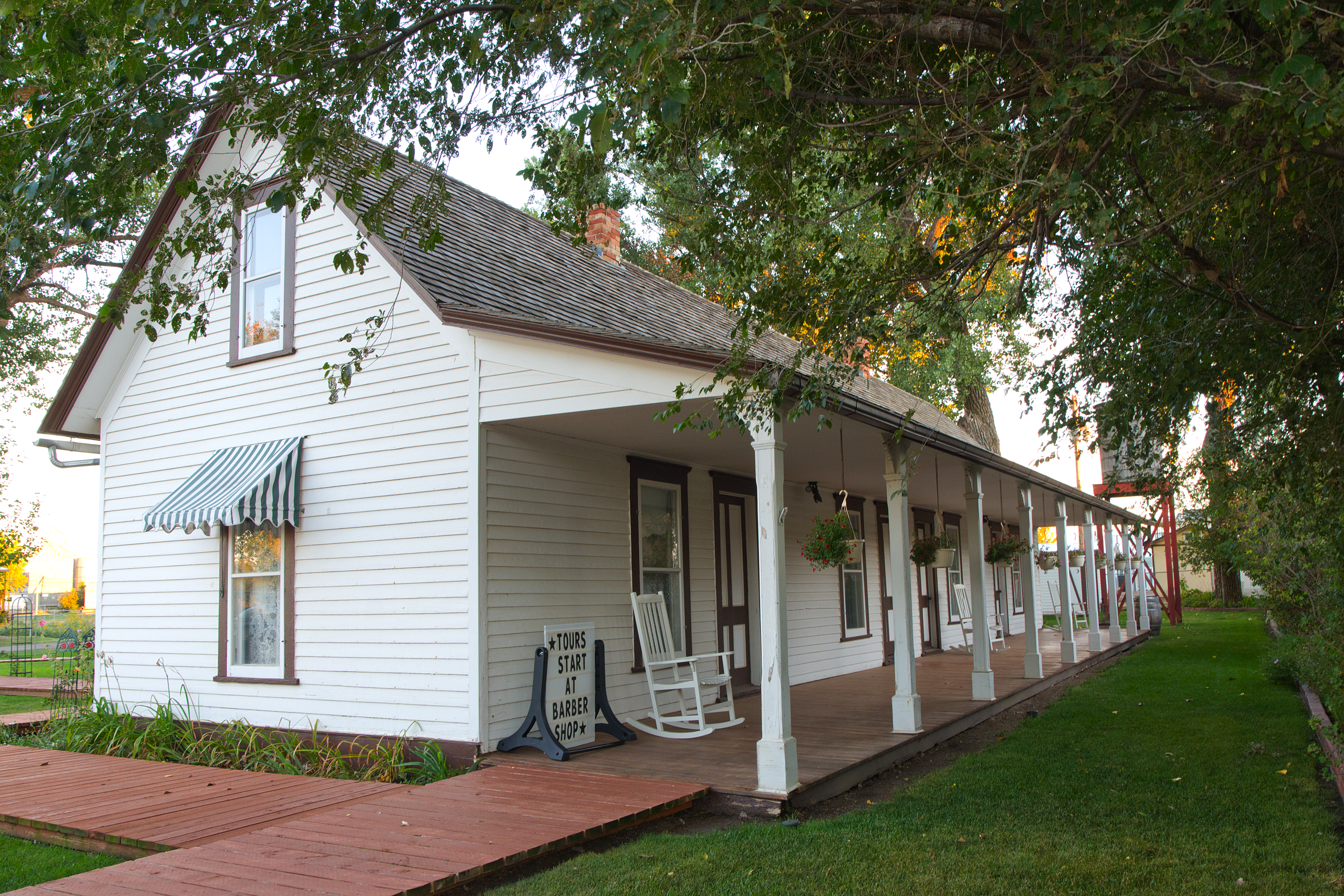
Pierre Wibaux in town house

Pierre Wibaux (January 12, 1858 – March 21, 1913) was a French cattle owner and rancher in Montana and North Dakota at the turn of the 20th century. He immigrated from his native France to seek business opportunities in America and was among the most successful in the second wave of "Frontier Cowboys". He earned the title "Cattle King of Eastern Montana" due to his extensive holdings.

== Early life ==
Wibaux was born on January 12, 1858, to a prosperous family of textile industrialists in Roubaix, France. His father, Achille, ran the family textile factory he had inherited from his own father, Desiré Joseph Wibaux. It was expected that Pierre would continue the family business.

In 1876 he spent a year serving in the army with the French Dragoons. He spent three years traveling Europe, then two years traveling to English textile mills. While there he learned about the riches available to American ranchers. When he returned to France, he announced his intention to travel to America to try his luck at cattle ranching rather than taking over the family business. With much reluctance his father agreed and gave him $10,000 to start his new venture.

== Cattle ranching ==
In 1883, Wibaux immigrated to America and traveled to Chicago. There he spent time in the Stock Yards learning about the cattle market. He met the Marquis de Mores, who recently began ranching in North Dakota, and the two traveled together to North Dakota and Montana. They found a spot on Beaver Creek in Montana and Wibaux decided to build his ranch there. Along with Gustave Grisy, a short-lived partner, he traveled to Sioux City, Iowa, then an important livestock center. Wibaux continued his education in the livestock market by taking an active role. In a letter to his brother while there he wrote: "I have to be cashier, bookkeeper, correspondent, salesman, buyer, seller, and sometimes a cowboy all at the same time". Determined to understand the business, he worked as foreman at his ranch for the next five years.

In late fall 1883, he traveled to Europe to marry and procure additional capital. His father and brother helped him establish the Pierre Wibaux Company which was capitalized at $200,000. He and his new wife Mary Ellen, who he met earlier in England, lived in his simple log cabin on the creek until he built a proper house. The 80 x 36 frame house was completed in 1885. It became known as the "White House" or "Palace" and was the center of hospitality. They had running water, a tree-lined scoria drive to the house, and a professional French gardener. Over time he also built a house for the foreman, bunkhouses for 20 cowboys, and housing for servants who came from France.

He and Grisy, another immigrated Frenchman, did not have an amicable partnership. Wibaux wrote to his brother, "He has not had one useful idea yet." Differences included Grisy wanting to build a nice house while Wibaux focused on cattle and bringing income. After ending the partnership in 1885, Wibaux began using W as his brand and his holdings became known as the W Bar Ranch.

The conditions in the area were ideal for raising stock and his ranch quickly gained well over 10,000 head of cattle. Within a few years of his arrival he grazed his cattle on around 70,000 acres of open range. Wibaux recognized the need for transporting his cattle. He persuaded Northern Pacific Railway to build stock yards and a depot at what was known at the time as the town of Mingusville. By 1885, 17,000 head of cattle were shipped from town, likely making it the top shipping point of the entire route.

The nearby town was named after Wibaux's former partner Gus Grisy and his wife Minnie, who worked the post office and saloon. Wibaux led a petition to change the name and personally gathered some of the signatures. He submitted the petition to the Montana Legislature and the town name was legally changed to Wibaux.

Because his ranch house was about 12 miles from town, he built an office, which included a kitchen and sleeping quarter, in 1892. Just like his house, the office was surrounded by gardens, trees, fountains, and statuary. He also built another ranch area sixty miles north of Wibaux and several cabins forty miles apart on the Yellowstone River.

The range cattle industry experienced rapid growth in the early 1880's. Then after a summer with continued drought, the region had an extremely harsh winter in 1886-87. Heavy snow fell, followed by warm weather causing melts, then temperatures fell drastically causing ice to form across the open range. It is estimated that between 60% and 75% of the cattle in the Bad Lands area perished. Some companies lost 90% of their stock. Wibaux's losses were smaller due to an area swept clean of snow and well sheltered valleys on his land.

Wibaux saw an opportunity in the storm: only the sturdiest and most resilient beasts survived this trial, so he went back to France to borrow the necessary funds to buy out all the remaining cattle from desperate neighboring ranchers at low prices. Also, the shortage of beef available ensured high sale prices for Wibaux's stock for the following 3 years. He also bought from Eastern and foreign owned companies who wanted to salvage their investments. After that winter he leased and purchased grazing land throughout what is now Dawson and Wibaux counties. He was one of the first ranchers to grow alfalfa for winter feed.

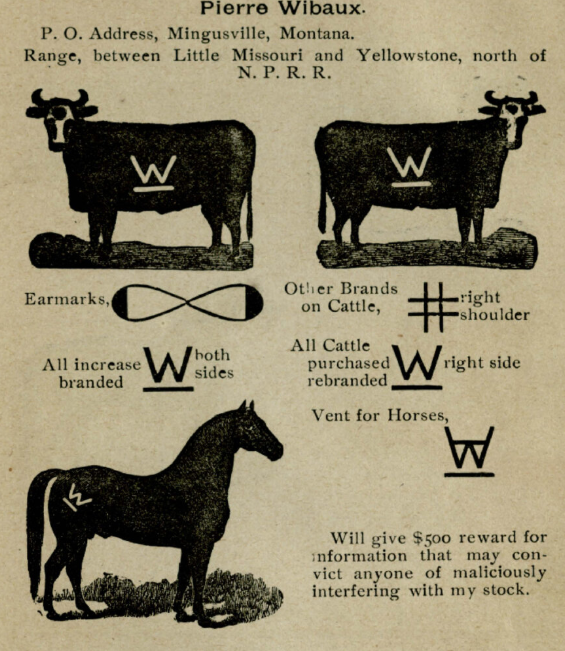
Wibaux's brand

In 1889 Wibaux sold his entire stock of horses to Green Mountain Ranching Company in Forsyth. Most of the horses were purchased at $22 a head and he sold them for $60. He then purchased Green Mountain's entire herd of cattle. He continued buying cattle from ranches and by 1890 he had 40,000 head of cattle and branded 10,000 calves.

In the 1890s, Wibaux had amassed one of the largest herds in the world, with over 65,000 cattle and 300 horses. The W Bar cattle ranged from the Little Missouri river west to the Yellowstone, and from the Northern Pacific railroad north to the Big Missouri. Spring round-up took three months and Wibaux actively participated. He also had around 200,000 acres in Texas with 8,000 head of cattle.

In 1890, he sold a large amount of his herd to Nelson Morris, a Chicago packer. Between the time of the contract and the shipping season, cattle prices went down significantly. Morris tried to annul the contract but Wibaux rejected his offer of $25,000. After the sale of cattle in Chicago, Wibaux brought suit against Morris for the difference between the original contract price and what they netted on the market. The suit lasted five years and eventually the Illinois Supreme Court forced Morris to pay Wibaux $62,364.91 and all expenses involved in the suit.

In 1899 Wibaux sold all of his range cows to John B. Holt of Miles City. Shortly after, his foreman traveled to Texas to buy more cattle. Due to fires and grazing by sheep, Wibaux determined there was no range for them, so he sold them as soon as they were delivered. The area also had an influx of homesteaders, causing open grazing land to become private land, sometimes fenced in with barbed wire. He then bought land about 70 miles north of Miles City, Montana and all cattle purchased after 1900 went to this grazing land. He sold all the cattle in the Wibaux area in 1901. He operated the remaining cattle until 1907.

A 1900 article in the Miles City Yellowstone Journal ascribed Wibaux's success to his "rare business judgement coupled with an indomitable will power and the courage of convictions." Dr. Donald Walsh, who wrote his master's thesis on Wibaux, had additional ideas. He credits Wibaux's progressive practices such as studying the market for animals in greatest demand and best time for shipping, improving animals through breeding stock, putting up large sections of native hay, and eliminating wolves. He also introduced the chain drag method for fighting prairie fires, a major concern for grazing on the open range.

== Other activities ==
He ran cattle until 1900 and then pursued other endeavors. Besides Montana and the Dakotas, he had business interests in France, Mexico, California, and Alaska.

In 1900 Wibaux moved to Miles City. He had become President and principal owner of the State National Bank there in 1896. He also owned the Wibaux Block where the bank sat. He was the main stockholder in American Bankers' Life Insurance Company based in Chicago.

Wibaux owned the Clover Leaf Gold Mining Company which was thriving on gold-mines in the Black Hills region. The nearby town was re-named Roubaix for his hometown.

He represented Dawson County for the Montana Stock Growers' Association.

== Philanthropy ==
Like the Carnegies and Rockefellers of his time, Wibaux too was a philanthropist. He always remained attached to his native Roubaix and was among the large contributors to help build the Hôpital de la Fraternité. He donated 25,000 Francs to establish "model Farms" which would produce quality milk for those in need (in early 1900s France, bad nutritional hygiene was a major cause of infant mortality). This generous contribution helped put in place the "Goutte de Lait" foundation, of which Wibaux was named president.

For all of his industrial and agricultural achievements and philanthropic work, Wibaux was awarded the "National Order of the Legion of Honour", the highest and most prestigious decoration in France.

He contributed to the growth of both Wibaux and Miles City. At the urging, and possible financial help, of his father, Wibaux built St. Peter's Catholic Church in Wibaux in 1885. He bequested a large park in Miles City which is named in his honor. He added to the culture and entertainment of Wibaux as well. He held what was possibly the first rodeo in Montana in order to demonstrate cowboy skills to visiting French nobility. He and Frank Smith, both thoroughbred horse enthusiasts, built a race track in Wibaux. They formed the Highland Racing Association and sponsored several races.

== Legacy ==
A twice-size bronze statue of Wibaux stands on a hill west of Wibaux overlooking the town. The statue is looking north toward his ranch twelve miles away and he is dressed in cowboy clothes. He holds a rifle in his right hand and binoculars in his left. He requested his ashes be brought back to Montana and buried under the statue.

He was inducted into the Montana Cowboy Hall of Fame in 2012.

The Pierre Wibaux Museum includes the home he shared with his wife and son. The W-Bar Ranch house was destroyed in a fire in the 1920s.

== Death ==
Toward the end of his life, Wibaux wintered in Paris where his wife Nellie and son Cyril lived. They are buried at Père Lachaise Cemetery in Paris. He died in St. Luke's Hospital, Chicago, Illinois, on March 21, 1913. The total value of his estate was appraised at $515,414. Additionally over $100,000 in dividends, interest, and rent were added.
