= Vogt–Nunberg Farm =

- U.S. National Register of Historic Places
- U.S. Historic district
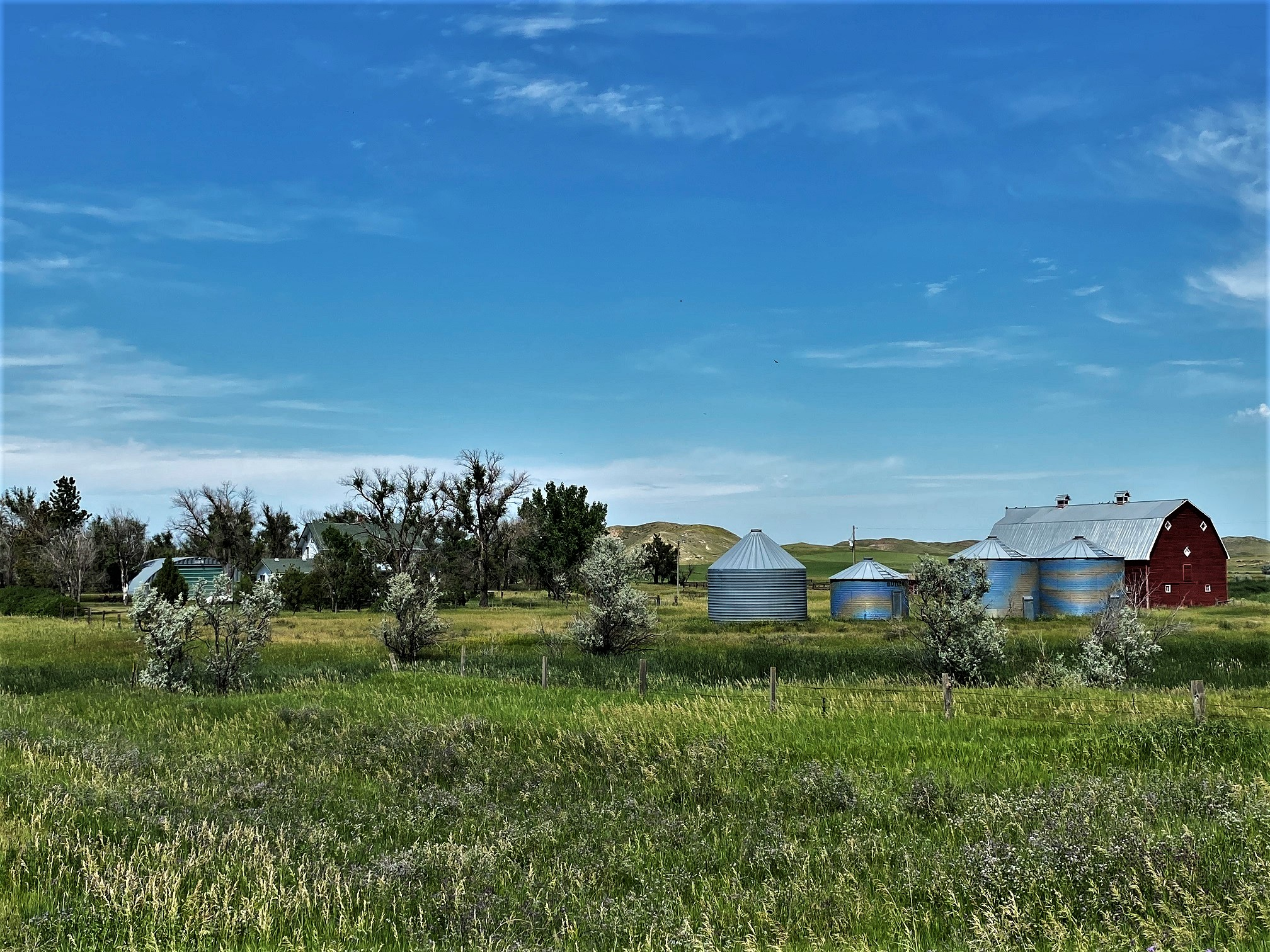

- Location within Montana Location within the United States
- Location: 7262 Montana Highway 7, Wibaux, Montana
- Coordinates: 46°53′07″N 104°12′1″W
- NRHP reference No.: 08000269
- Added to NRHP: April 10, 2008

The Vogt–Nunberg Farm is a site on the National Register of Historic Places located in Wibaux, Montana. It was added to the Register on April 10, 2008. The application papers state the farm "is an important example of an early twentieth century diversified farming operation in eastern Montana".

The placard reads:

Twenty-year-old John Vogt arrived in the Beaver Valley in 1910 at the height of the homesteading boom. Boosters promoted "good soil, good climate, good schools, [and] good markets" and touted new dry-land farming techniques that promised high crop yields without irrigation. Not all would-be farmers took out homesteads. The Northern Pacific Railroad already owned 13.3 million acres in Montana, which it had acquired from the federal government to help finance construction of its transcontinental line. Eager for new customers, the railroad aggressively marketed its holdings, offering good terms to anyone interested in acquiring land. With his brother Jacob homesteading nearby, John Vogt purchased this farm from the railroad in 1911. He hired local builder Joe Novantey to construct a two-story residence as well as the farm's centerpiece, a 73-foot-by-35-foot balloon-frame cattle barn. Balloon framing, which used milled lumber instead of timber, was standard practice on the Great Plains. A chicken coop, feed house, and hog shed, also built during Vogt's tenure, reflect his diversified operation. John married Charlotte Bott in 1917, and together the couple weathered drought and low commodity prices before selling the farm to Alfred and Victoria Nunberg in 1929. The Nunbergs survived the Great Depression by raising pigs, chickens, sheep, beef and dairy cattle, wheat, barley, oats, and hay. They also hosted community dances in their barn's large hay loft to supplement their income. Despite hard times, they raised nine children, improved the farm, and enlarged their holdings. Son Fred took over the operation in 1958, actively farming until 1995.
