= Fallon County, Montana =

County in Montana, United States

- County
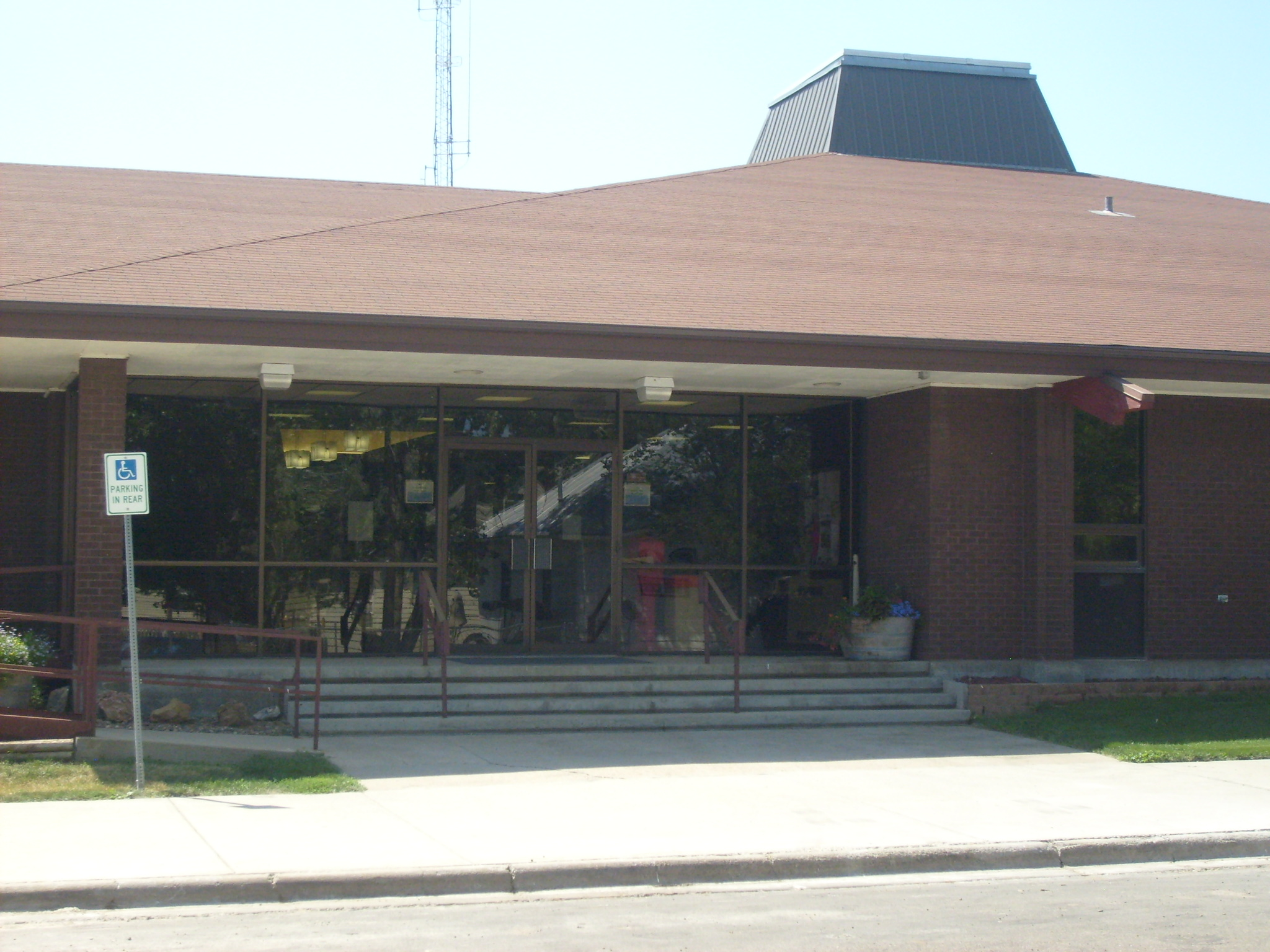
- Fallon County Courthouse in Baker

- Location within the U.S. state of Montana
- Coordinates: 46°21′N 104°25′W
- Country: United States
- State: Montana
- Founded: December 9, 1913
- Seat: Baker
- Largest city: Baker

Area
  - Total: 1,623 sq mi (4,200 km^{2})
  - Land: 1,621 sq mi (4,200 km^{2})
  - Water: 2.3 sq mi (6.0 km^{2}) 0.1%

Population (2020)
  - Total: 3,049
  - Estimate (2025): 2,959 ▼
  - Density: 1.881/sq mi (0.7262/km^{2})
- Time zone: UTC−7 (Mountain)
  - Summer (DST): UTC−6 (MDT)
- Congressional district: 2nd
- Website: falloncountymt.gov
- Montana county number 39

Fallon County is a county located in the U.S. state of Montana. As of the 2020 census, the population was 3,049. Its county seat is Baker. The county was created in 1913 from a portion of Custer County. It is named for Benjamin O'Fallon, a nephew of Captain William Clark and an Indian agent for the upper Missouri region from 1823 to 1827.

== Geography ==
According to the United States Census Bureau, the county has a total area of 1,623 square miles (4,200 km^{2}), of which 1,621 square miles (4,200 km^{2}) is land and 2.3 square miles (6.0 km^{2}) (0.1%) is water.

=== Adjacent counties ===
- Wibaux County - north
- Prairie County - northwest
- Custer County - west
- Carter County - south
- Harding County, South Dakota - southeast
- Bowman County, North Dakota - east
- Slope County, North Dakota - east
- Golden Valley County, North Dakota - northeast

== Politics ==
Fallon County is a heavily Republican county, like most in eastern Montana, having supported the Republican presidential candidate in every election since 1936.

United States presidential election results for Fallon County, Montana
| Year | Republican | | Democratic | | Third party(ies) | |
| Year | No. | % | No. | % | No. | % |
|---|---|---|---|---|---|---|
| 1916 | 1,169 | 37.54% | 1,845 | 59.25% | 100 | 3.21% |
| 1920 | 1,064 | 71.36% | 381 | 25.55% | 46 | 3.09% |
| 1924 | 731 | 55.63% | 220 | 16.74% | 363 | 27.63% |
| 1928 | 1,036 | 69.07% | 454 | 30.27% | 10 | 0.67% |
| 1932 | 690 | 39.79% | 973 | 56.11% | 71 | 4.09% |
| 1936 | 598 | 36.00% | 1,015 | 61.11% | 48 | 2.89% |
| 1940 | 925 | 56.96% | 686 | 42.24% | 13 | 0.80% |
| 1944 | 870 | 63.46% | 494 | 36.03% | 7 | 0.51% |
| 1948 | 678 | 51.02% | 623 | 46.88% | 28 | 2.11% |
| 1952 | 1,046 | 70.01% | 440 | 29.45% | 8 | 0.54% |
| 1956 | 967 | 61.24% | 612 | 38.76% | 0 | 0.00% |
| 1960 | 918 | 60.55% | 597 | 39.38% | 1 | 0.07% |
| 1964 | 827 | 51.85% | 765 | 47.96% | 3 | 0.19% |
| 1968 | 990 | 63.26% | 477 | 30.48% | 98 | 6.26% |
| 1972 | 1,034 | 64.46% | 531 | 33.10% | 39 | 2.43% |
| 1976 | 934 | 51.98% | 847 | 47.13% | 16 | 0.89% |
| 1980 | 1,286 | 66.98% | 512 | 26.67% | 122 | 6.35% |
| 1984 | 1,237 | 67.63% | 569 | 31.11% | 23 | 1.26% |
| 1988 | 1,002 | 61.25% | 612 | 37.41% | 22 | 1.34% |
| 1992 | 731 | 45.46% | 446 | 27.74% | 431 | 26.80% |
| 1996 | 778 | 51.32% | 452 | 29.82% | 286 | 18.87% |
| 2000 | 1,061 | 77.50% | 256 | 18.70% | 52 | 3.80% |
| 2004 | 1,178 | 79.01% | 289 | 19.38% | 24 | 1.61% |
| 2008 | 1,064 | 74.25% | 318 | 22.19% | 51 | 3.56% |
| 2012 | 1,128 | 80.23% | 237 | 16.86% | 41 | 2.92% |
| 2016 | 1,279 | 86.19% | 154 | 10.38% | 51 | 3.44% |
| 2020 | 1,375 | 87.30% | 172 | 10.92% | 28 | 1.78% |
| 2024 | 1,303 | 86.46% | 163 | 10.82% | 41 | 2.72% |

== Demographics ==
Historical population
| Census | Pop. | Note | %± |
|---|---|---|---|
| 1920 | 4,548 | | — |
| 1930 | 4,568 | | 0.4% |
| 1940 | 3,719 | | −18.6% |
| 1950 | 3,660 | | −1.6% |
| 1960 | 3,997 | | 9.2% |
| 1970 | 4,050 | | 1.3% |
| 1980 | 3,763 | | −7.1% |
| 1990 | 3,103 | | −17.5% |
| 2000 | 2,837 | | −8.6% |
| 2010 | 2,890 | | 1.9% |
| 2020 | 3,049 | | 5.5% |
| 2025 (est.) | 2,959 | ▼ | −3.0% |
U.S. Decennial Census; 1790–1960, 1900–1990, 1990–2000, 2010–2020

=== 2020 census ===
As of the 2020 census, the county had a population of 3,049. Of the residents, 27.6% were under the age of 18 and 17.7% were 65 years of age or older; the median age was 39.0 years. For every 100 females there were 99.2 males, and for every 100 females age 18 and over there were 101.2 males. 0.0% of residents lived in urban areas and 100.0% lived in rural areas.

The racial makeup of the county was 94.7% White, 0.2% Black or African American, 0.9% American Indian and Alaska Native, 0.2% Asian, 0.4% from some other race, and 3.5% from two or more races. Hispanic or Latino residents of any race comprised 2.1% of the population.

There were 1,213 households in the county, of which 31.3% had children under the age of 18 living with them and 19.7% had a female householder with no spouse or partner present. About 29.0% of all households were made up of individuals and 13.9% had someone living alone who was 65 years of age or older.

There were 1,526 housing units, of which 20.5% were vacant. Among occupied housing units, 76.3% were owner-occupied and 23.7% were renter-occupied. The homeowner vacancy rate was 2.3% and the rental vacancy rate was 24.9%.

=== 2010 census ===
As of the 2010 census, there were 2,890 people, 1,233 households, and 810 families living in the county. The population density was 1.8 inhabitants per square mile (0.69/km^{2}). There were 1,470 housing units at an average density of 0.9 units per square mile (0.35 units/km^{2}). The racial makeup of the county was 97.4% white, 0.6% Asian, 0.4% American Indian, 0.1% Pacific islander, 0.1% black or African American, 0.2% from other races, and 1.3% from two or more races. Those of Hispanic or Latino origin made up 1.2% of the population. In terms of ancestry, 53.0% were German, 24.8% were Irish, 12.1% were Norwegian, 10.6% were English, 5.3% were Scotch-Irish, and 0.4% were American.

Of the 1,233 households, 28.4% had children under the age of 18 living with them, 56.0% were married couples living together, 5.7% had a female householder with no husband present, 34.3% were non-families, and 30.1% of all households were made up of individuals. The average household size was 2.32 and the average family size was 2.88. The median age was 42.9 years.

The median income for a household in the county was $52,529 and the median income for a family was $64,500. Males had a median income of $41,570 versus $30,000 for females. The per capita income for the county was $26,819. About 5.7% of families and 8.5% of the population were below the poverty line, including 16.3% of those under age 18 and 3.4% of those age 65 or over.

== Transportation ==
=== Major highways ===
- U.S. Highway 12
- Montana Highway 7

=== Airport ===
The Baker Municipal Airport is southeast of Baker.

== Communities ==
=== Cities ===
- Baker (county seat)

=== Towns ===
- Plevna

=== Unincorporated communities ===
- Cabin Creek
- Ollie
- Webster
- Westmore
- Willard

== See also ==
- List of lakes in Fallon County, Montana
- List of mountains in Fallon County, Montana
- National Register of Historic Places listings in Fallon County, Montana
