= Roubaix, South Dakota =

Roubaix, South Dakota Lewisville Perry
- unincorporated community
- Location of Roubaix in South Dakota
- Coordinates: 44.2758183°N 103.6663058°W
- Country: United States
- State: South Dakota
- County: Lawrence
- Founded: August 1885
- Elevation: 5,381 ft (1,640 m)
- Time zone: UTC-7 (MST)
  - Summer (DST): UTC-6 (MDT)
- Area code(s): 605

Roubaix (/roʊˈbeɪ/ roh-BAY), formerly known as Perry or Lewisville, is an unincorporated community in Lawrence County, South Dakota, United States. It is not monitored by the U.S. Census Bureau.

== Naming ==
Roubaix was originally called Lewisville, but it was changed to Perry when the town gained a post office. When the Chicago, Burlington and Quincy Railroad began building into the Black Hills, the town again changed its name to avoid confusion with Terry, which was nearby. Roubaix was chosen in honor of the hometown of local Frenchman Pierre Wibaux, who was one of the Uncle Sam Mine's main investors.

== History ==
=== Founding and growth ===
The mining camp was first settled in 1876. It was first a placer mining camp, with the primary source of gold being nearby Elk Creek. The town nearly disappeared after the Uncle Sam Mine was shut down in 1880, and a forest fire destroyed a large portion of the town. The grand reopening of Roubaix and its official recognition as a town was marked by a celebration in August 1885 at a beer hall, complete with a dance. In the years following 1891, due to failed mining activity, the town nearly became abandoned. In 1899, Roubaix had 500 residents, a post office, several stores, a hospital, boarding houses, a newspaper, a barber shop, a few churches, and its own city hall. There was once a typhoid fever epidemic in the area. The town was home to several organizations, including a tennis club, literature group, whist club, and a miners' union. Before the early 1900s, there was no designated school building, and classes were held in various buildings around camp.

=== Local mining operations ===
Roubaix relied heavily on the Uncle Sam Mine, which was discovered in 1878 and produced gold. Quartz was later harvested in a one-stamp mill that made $50,000. By 1880, the new mine had closed and was flooded. In 1885, more stamps for the stamp mills were brought from Tigerville, and a 60-stamp mill was brought from Esmeralda. By October 1886, after a change in management, the mine began to have trouble with its water pumps. The resulting drop in activity nearly caused Roubaix to become abandoned. In 1898, the Clover Leaf Gold Mining Company arrived, headed by Pierre Wibaux. They bought the mine and repaired the 60-stamp mill, fixed the buildings, brought in a sawmill, and had electricity installed. From 1889 to 1905, Wibaux mined $900,000 worth of gold. Most of the ore was pure, and simple mercury amalgamation allowed for 90% of the ore to be recovered. This new activity revived the town. However, Wibaux's fellow miners began stealing the ore, causing him to lose profits.

On June 4, 1905, the fires were pulled to clean the boilers, and the 7th-level sill floor caved in. The water blocked the pumps and caused them to burn out. Pressure from the boiler caused the dam to break and flood the lower levels. A fissure in Elk Creek was supposed, and plans were made to build a diversion dam, but it was never executed. The mine was forced to be abandoned. The destruction of the mine caused the town of Roubaix to decline. In 1934, the mine reopened but closed again in 1935, when the Anaconda Gold Mining and Milling Company only mined $10,000 in gold. The land was sold to a private owner in 1937.

=== Later history and today ===
The post office continued operation until the 1940s. The shaft house at the mine was destroyed during a windstorm in 1953, and the school was torn down in the 1960s. Today, there are only a few of the old houses left standing. The foundations of the mine can still be seen. The only remnants of the mills are a couple of bullwheels. However, the town still has a very small population. There are no businesses in the town.

== Geography ==
Roubaix is in the Black Hills of western Lawrence County, at the coordinates 44.2758183°N 103.6663058°W. It is located on the east side of U.S. Route 385 along Elk Creek and is approximately seven miles south of Pluma.

=== Climate ===
Climate data for Roubaix, South Dakota
Month	Jan	Feb	Mar	Apr	May	Jun	Jul	Aug	Sep	Oct	Nov	Dec	Year
Record high °F (°C)	69 (21)	66 (19)	74 (23)	84 (29)	88 (31)	96 (36)	99 (37)	98 (37)	96 (36)	84 (29)	74 (23)	65 (18)	99 (37)
Mean daily maximum °F (°C)	36 (2)	37 (3)	43 (6)	52 (11)	61 (16)	71 (22)	79 (26)	78 (26)	68 (20)	55 (13)	43 (6)	35 (2)	55 (13)
Mean daily minimum °F (°C)	17 (−8)	18 (−8)	23 (−5)	31 (−1)	40 (4)	49 (9)	56 (13)	55 (13)	45 (7)	34 (1)	24 (−4)	16 (−9)	34 (1)
Record low °F (°C)	−27 (−33)	−32 (−36)	−17 (−27)	−5 (−21)	9 (−13)	24 (−4)	36 (2)	33 (1)	15 (−9)	−5 (−21)	−16 (−27)	−33 (−36)	−33 (−36)
Average precipitation inches (mm)	1.34 (34)	1.65 (42)	2.58 (66)	3.55 (90)	4.64 (118)	3.57 (91)	2.76 (70)	2.09 (53)	1.99 (51)	3.04 (77)	1.83 (46)	1.51 (38)	30.55 (776)
Source: The Weather Channel (Historical Monthly Averages)
