= Baker, Montana =

City in Montana, United States

Baker
- City
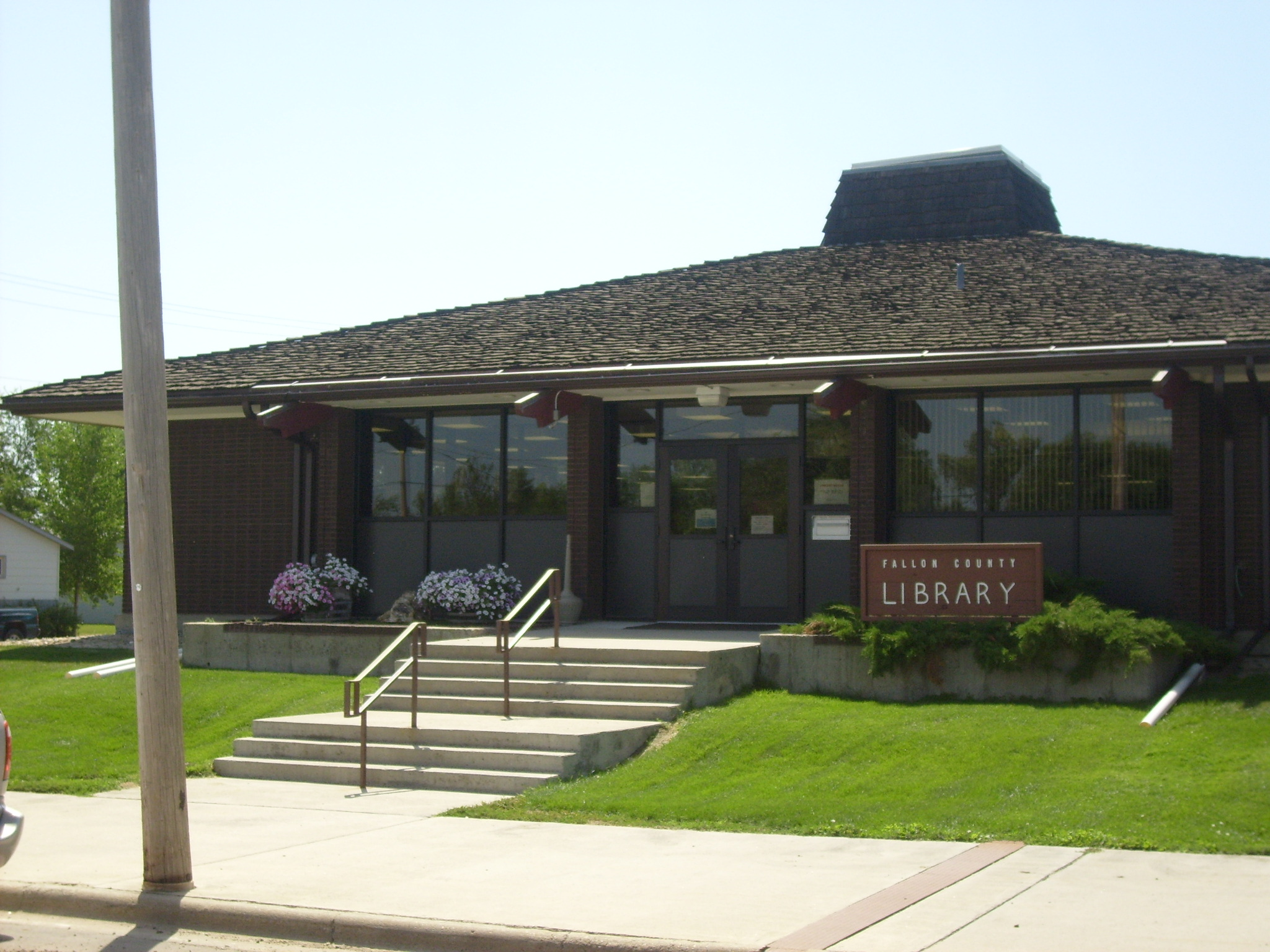
- Fallon County Library
- Nickname: "Friendly City"
- Location of Baker, Montana
- Coordinates: 46°21′53″N 104°16′30″W
- Country: United States
- State: Montana
- County: Fallon

Government
  - Type: Mayor-Council
  - Mayor: Steve Zachmann

Area
  - Total: 1.23 sq mi (3.18 km^{2})
  - Land: 1.13 sq mi (2.93 km^{2})
  - Water: 0.10 sq mi (0.26 km^{2})
- Elevation: 2,940 ft (900 m)

Population (2020)
  - Total: 1,802
  - Density: 1,595.3/sq mi (615.96/km^{2})
- Time zone: UTC-7 (Mountain (MST))
  - Summer (DST): UTC-6 (MDT)
- ZIP codes: 59313, 59354
- Area code: 406
- FIPS code: 30-03475
- GNIS feature ID: 2409772
- Website: www.bakermontana.us

Baker is a city in and the county seat of Fallon County, Montana, United States. The population was 1,802 at the 2020 census.

It was named after A. G. Baker, an engineer with the Chicago, Milwaukee, St. Paul and Pacific Railroad.

== History ==
Baker was built along the transcontinental rail line of the Milwaukee Road near where the railroad created a lake to supply water to its steam locomotives. The city was known as Lorraine for a brief time before being renamed in honor of Milwaukee Road engineer A.G. Baker. A successful Milwaukee Land Company campaign to attract homesteaders to the area allowed the city to grow and serve a large community of dryland farmers. Additional growth occurred following the 1912 discovery of oil and natural gas deposits nearby.

In 2014, Baker was described as "a busy, noisy, traffic-jammed, bursting-at-the-seams boomtown on the edge of the oil fields." On June 11, 2016, an EF-3 Tornado struck Baker destroying several houses and damaging dozens more, killing multiple horses in the area and injuring six people.

== Geography ==
U.S. Route 12 passes through town.

According to the United States Census Bureau, the city has a total area of 1.07 square miles (2.77 km^{2}), of which 0.97 square miles (2.51 km^{2}) is land and 0.10 square miles (0.26 km^{2}) is water.

Sandstone rock is the predominant feature. Nearby Medicine Rocks State Park has many unusual sandstone rock formations.

=== Climate ===
According to the Köppen Climate Classification system, Baker has a cold semi-arid climate, abbreviated "BSk" on climate maps. The hottest temperature recorded in Baker was 110 °F (43 °C) on July 12, 2026, while the coldest temperature recorded was −34 °F (−37 °C) on February 14, 2021.

Climate data for Baker, Montana (Baker Municipal Airport), 1991–2020 normals, extremes 1998–present
Month	Jan	Feb	Mar	Apr	May	Jun	Jul	Aug	Sep	Oct	Nov	Dec	Year
Record high °F (°C)	61 (16)	68 (20)	82 (28)	93 (34)	94 (34)	108 (42)	110 (43)	108 (42)	101 (38)	91 (33)	80 (27)	70 (21)	110 (43)
Mean maximum °F (°C)	50.0 (10.0)	50.7 (10.4)	68.1 (20.1)	77.7 (25.4)	83.6 (28.7)	92.8 (33.8)	99.6 (37.6)	98.6 (37.0)	93.4 (34.1)	79.9 (26.6)	67.7 (19.8)	52.5 (11.4)	101.4 (38.6)
Mean daily maximum °F (°C)	28.3 (−2.1)	31.4 (−0.3)	43.0 (6.1)	54.7 (12.6)	65.3 (18.5)	75.8 (24.3)	85.4 (29.7)	84.6 (29.2)	73.3 (22.9)	56.6 (13.7)	42.0 (5.6)	31.2 (−0.4)	56.0 (13.3)
Daily mean °F (°C)	17.7 (−7.9)	20.9 (−6.2)	31.6 (−0.2)	42.3 (5.7)	52.6 (11.4)	62.8 (17.1)	70.7 (21.5)	69.1 (20.6)	58.6 (14.8)	43.8 (6.6)	30.8 (−0.7)	20.7 (−6.3)	43.5 (6.4)
Mean daily minimum °F (°C)	7.0 (−13.9)	10.3 (−12.1)	20.2 (−6.6)	29.9 (−1.2)	40.0 (4.4)	49.9 (9.9)	56.1 (13.4)	53.7 (12.1)	44.0 (6.7)	31.1 (−0.5)	19.5 (−6.9)	10.2 (−12.1)	31.0 (−0.6)
Mean minimum °F (°C)	−18.6 (−28.1)	−16.7 (−27.1)	−3.1 (−19.5)	12.5 (−10.8)	26.5 (−3.1)	39.1 (3.9)	46.5 (8.1)	41.7 (5.4)	30.7 (−0.7)	13.9 (−10.1)	−3.2 (−19.6)	−16.7 (−27.1)	−26.8 (−32.7)
Record low °F (°C)	−31 (−35)	−34 (−37)	−28 (−33)	−5 (−21)	15 (−9)	30 (−1)	41 (5)	36 (2)	22 (−6)	−4 (−20)	−17 (−27)	−33 (−36)	−34 (−37)
Average precipitation inches (mm)	0.22 (5.6)	0.25 (6.4)	0.53 (13)	1.35 (34)	2.66 (68)	2.81 (71)	2.03 (52)	1.49 (38)	1.53 (39)	1.10 (28)	0.43 (11)	0.18 (4.6)	14.58 (370.6)
Average snowfall inches (cm)	5.8 (15)	5.8 (15)	5.3 (13)	3.6 (9.1)	1.1 (2.8)	0.0 (0.0)	0.0 (0.0)	0.0 (0.0)	0.0 (0.0)	1.2 (3.0)	1.8 (4.6)	4.8 (12)	29.4 (74.5)
Average precipitation days (≥ 0.01 in)	3.4	5.1	5.6	8.2	12.3	12.2	8.6	8.1	8.0	8.2	4.4	3.7	87.8
Average snowy days (≥ 0.1 in)	2.9	3.8	2.3	0.9	0.4	0.0	0.0	0.0	0.0	0.5	1.3	2.7	14.8
Source 1: NOAA
Source 2: National Weather Service (mean maxima and minima 2006–2020)

== Demographics ==
Historical population
Census	Pop.	Note	%±
1920	1,067		—
1930	1,212		13.6%
1940	1,304		7.6%
1950	1,772		35.9%
1960	2,365		33.5%
1970	2,584		9.3%
1980	2,354		−8.9%
1990	1,818		−22.8%
2000	1,695		−6.8%
2010	1,741		2.7%
2020	1,802		3.5%
U.S. Decennial Census

=== 2020 census ===
As of the 2020 census, Baker had a population of 1,802. The median age was 36.8 years. 28.4% of residents were under the age of 18 and 16.4% of residents were 65 years of age or older. For every 100 females there were 92.5 males, and for every 100 females age 18 and over there were 95.8 males age 18 and over.

0.0% of residents lived in urban areas, while 100.0% lived in rural areas.

There were 738 households in Baker, of which 30.5% had children under the age of 18 living in them. Of all households, 49.7% were married-couple households, 20.5% were households with a male householder and no spouse or partner present, and 24.8% were households with a female householder and no spouse or partner present. About 34.7% of all households were made up of individuals and 15.7% had someone living alone who was 65 years of age or older.

There were 930 housing units, of which 20.6% were vacant. The homeowner vacancy rate was 3.4% and the rental vacancy rate was 27.6%.

Racial composition as of the 2020 census
Race	Number	Percent
White	1,702	94.5%
Black or African American	2	0.1%
American Indian and Alaska Native	24	1.3%
Asian	5	0.3%
Native Hawaiian and Other Pacific Islander	1	0.1%
Some other race	9	0.5%
Two or more races	59	3.3%
Hispanic or Latino (of any race)	39	2.2%

=== 2010 census ===
As of the census of 2010, there were 1,741 people, 763 households, and 459 families residing in the city. The population density was 1,794.8 inhabitants per square mile (693.0/km^{2}). There were 884 housing units at an average density of 911.3 units per square mile (351.9 units/km^{2}). The racial makeup of the city was 97.5% White, 0.1% African American, 0.4% Native American, 0.7% Asian, 0.2% from other races, and 1.2% from two or more races. Hispanic or Latino of any race were 1.3% of the population.

There were 763 households, of which 27.3% had children under the age of 18 living with them, 48.8% were married couples living together, 6.9% had a female householder with no husband present, 4.5% had a male householder with no wife present, and 39.8% were non-families. 34.3% of all households were made up of individuals, and 16.2% had someone living alone who was 65 years of age or older. The average household size was 2.24 and the average family size was 2.89.

The median age in the city was 39.3 years. 23.4% of residents were under the age of 18; 7.5% were between the ages of 18 and 24; 24.4% were from 25 to 44; 27.8% were from 45 to 64; and 16.9% were 65 years of age or older. The gender makeup of the city was 50.6% male and 49.4% female.

=== 2000 census ===
As of the census of 2000, there were 1,695 people, 694 households, and 455 families residing in the city. The population density was 1,974.8 inhabitants per square mile (762.5/km^{2}). There were 855 housing units at an average density of 996.2 units per square mile (384.6 units/km^{2}). The racial makeup of the city was 98.11% White, 0.24% African American, 0.53% Native American, 0.29% Asian, 0.06% Pacific Islander, 0.12% from other races, and 0.65% from two or more races. Hispanic or Latino of any race were 0.24% of the population.

There were 694 households, out of which 32.3% had children under the age of 18 living with them, 53.7% were married couples living together, 7.8% had a female householder with no husband present, and 34.3% were non-families. 30.8% of all households were made up of individuals, and 16.4% had someone living alone who was 65 years of age or older. The average household size was 2.38 and the average family size was 2.98.

In the city, the population was spread out, with 26.8% under the age of 18, 6.3% from 18 to 24, 25.0% from 25 to 44, 22.1% from 45 to 64, and 19.9% who were 65 years of age or older. The median age was 40 years. For every 100 females there were 97.1 males. For every 100 females age 18 and over, there were 88.6 males.

The median income for a household in the city was $30,893, and the median income for a family was $42,375. Males had a median income of $30,667 versus $17,500 for females. The per capita income for the city was $17,461. About 7.7% of families and 10.7% of the population were below the poverty line, including 15.3% of those under age 18 and 6.3% of those age 65 or over.

== Government ==
Baker has a mayor and city council. The city council has four members. Steve Zachmann was voted mayor in 2025.

== Arts and culture ==
O'Fallon Historical Museum is home to the world's largest steer.

The Fallon County Library serves the town of Baker.

== Education ==
Baker Public Schools educates students from kindergarten through 12th grade. Baker High School has an enrollment of 140, which places it in class B within the Montana high school sports system. The school mascot is the 'Spartan'. The Spartans have won 6 State Football Championships under long time coach Don Schillinger.

== Media ==
The Fallon County Times is the local newspaper. It is published weekly.

Two radio stations are licensed in Baker: KFLN AM, a country station, and KJJM FM, featuring classic rock music.

== Infrastructure ==
U.S. Route 12 passes through town from east to west. Montana Highway 7 runs north to south through town.

The Baker Municipal Airport is located one nautical mile (1.2 mi; 1.9 km) southeast of Baker's central business district.

== Notable people ==
- Bill Bowman, North Dakota state senator
- Irene Lentz, Hollywood costume designer
- Tyler Lyson, paleontologist (from North Dakota but attended Baker High School)
- Shann Schillinger, NFL player for the Atlanta Falcons
- Jack Westrope, Hall of Fame jockey

== See also ==
- List of cities and towns in Montana
