= Wibaux, Montana =

- Town
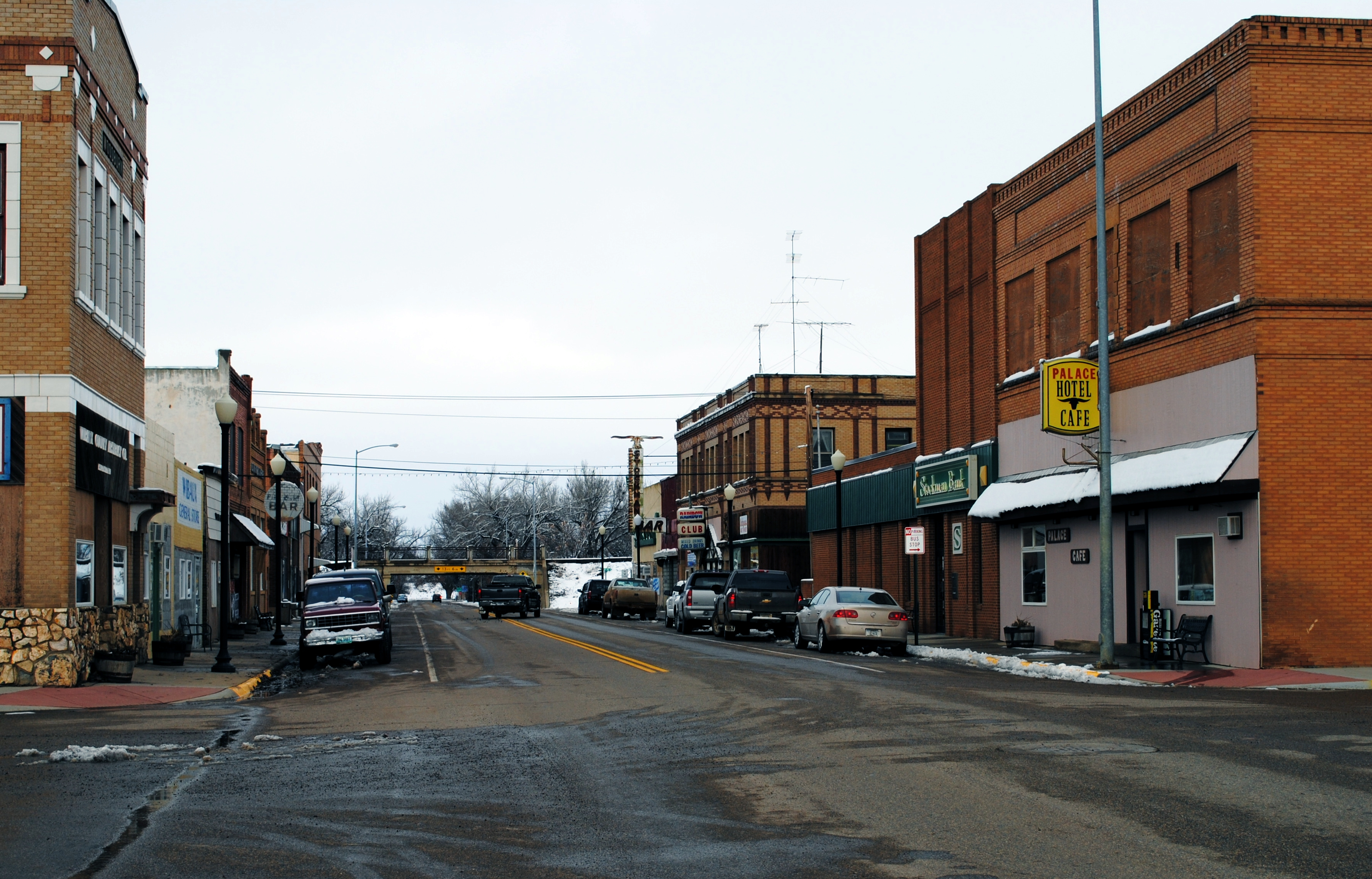
- Main Street in Wibaux

- Location of Wibaux, Montana
- Coordinates: 46°59′12″N 104°11′24″W
- Country: United States
- State: Montana
- County: Wibaux
- Named for: Pierre Wibaux

Area
  - Total: 1.07 sq mi (2.78 km^{2})
  - Land: 1.07 sq mi (2.78 km^{2})
  - Water: 0 sq mi (0.00 km^{2})
- Elevation: 2,654 ft (809 m)

Population (2020)
  - Total: 462
  - Density: 430.6/sq mi (166.26/km^{2})
- Time zone: UTC-7 (Mountain (MST))
  - Summer (DST): UTC-6 (MDT)
- ZIP code: 59353
- Area code: 406
- FIPS code: 30-80350
- GNIS feature ID: 2413483
- Website: townofwibaux.com

Wibaux (/ˈwiːboʊ/ WEE-boh) is a town in and the county seat of Wibaux County, Montana, United States. It is the only incorporated town in Wibaux County. The population was 462 at the 2020 census.

== History ==
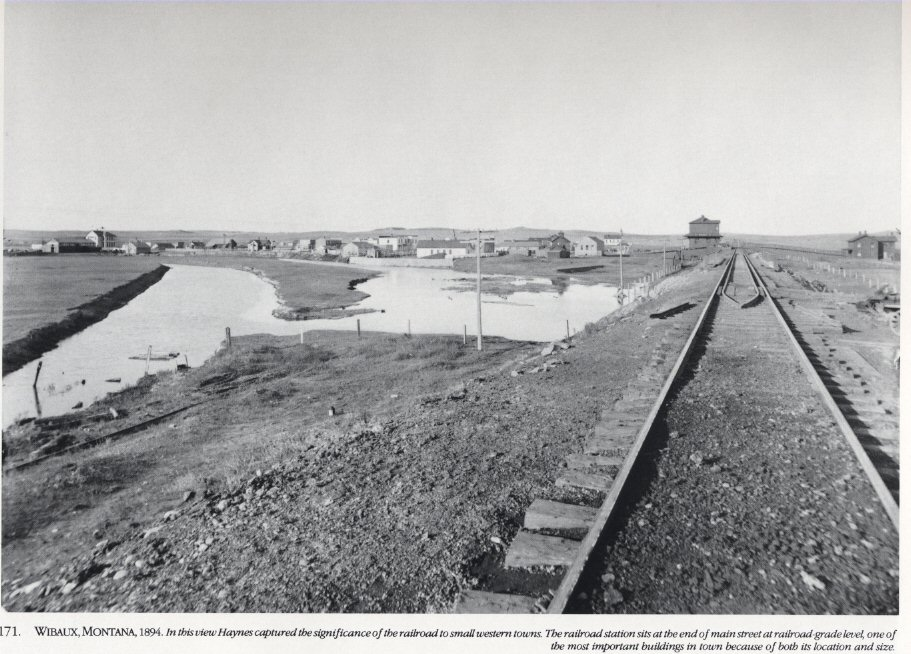
Northern Pacific Railway tracks in the Wibaux area in 1894, by Frank Jay Haynes.

The town originally had names such as Keith, Beaver, and Mingusville (named for Minnie and Gus Grisy, who ran the town's post office in the late 19th century). In 1895, the town was renamed for prominent local cattle rancher Pierre Wibaux, who had immigrated to the area from France in 1883. Wibaux expanded his herds by buying stock from less fortunate ranchers.

After Wibaux's arrival, the town became a major cattle shipping center for the Northern Pacific Railroad, notably receiving some of the cattle from Theodore Roosevelt's Maltese Cross and Elkhorn ranches near Medora, North Dakota. The great cattle drives of the 1880s often passed by Wibaux on their way from Texas to the northern ranges.

Theodore Roosevelt had a famous encounter with a bully at Nolan's Hotel in Wibaux (Mingusville, at the time) shortly after moving to the North Dakota Badlands in 1884. Arriving at the hotel late at night, Roosevelt was accosted by a drunk sheep herder carrying cocked revolvers in both hands, and ordered to buy drinks for the crowd. Roosevelt pretended to move towards the bar, then punched the man three times in quick succession, causing the drunk to fire his revolvers as he fell. The future president then took away the man's guns before several other occupants of the hotel dragged him out into a shed.

== Geography ==
Wibaux is located at Montana's border to North Dakota.

According to the United States Census Bureau, the town has a total area of 1.08 square miles (2.80 km^{2}), all land.

Beaver Creek runs through the town and has been known to contain large walleye and Northern Pike. The area around town also has deer, beavers, wild turkey, and antelope.

=== Climate ===
According to the Köppen Climate Classification system, Wibaux has a cold semi-arid climate, abbreviated "BSk" on climate maps. The hottest temperature recorded in Wibaux was 110 °F (43.3 °C) on August 1, 1918, May 29, 1919, and August 7, 1949, while the coldest temperature recorded was −55 °F (−48.3 °C) in January 1916.

Climate data for Wibaux, Montana, 1991–2020 normals, extremes 1895–2021
Month	Jan	Feb	Mar	Apr	May	Jun	Jul	Aug	Sep	Oct	Nov	Dec	Year
Record high °F (°C)	62 (17)	70 (21)	80 (27)	92 (33)	110 (43)	109 (43)	109 (43)	110 (43)	106 (41)	95 (35)	78 (26)	66 (19)	110 (43)
Mean maximum °F (°C)	48.6 (9.2)	51.7 (10.9)	67.4 (19.7)	77.5 (25.3)	84.4 (29.1)	92.0 (33.3)	97.7 (36.5)	98.0 (36.7)	93.8 (34.3)	80.6 (27.0)	63.4 (17.4)	50.6 (10.3)	100.4 (38.0)
Mean daily maximum °F (°C)	26.6 (−3.0)	30.4 (−0.9)	42.7 (5.9)	54.9 (12.7)	65.4 (18.6)	75.3 (24.1)	84.2 (29.0)	84.1 (28.9)	72.7 (22.6)	55.8 (13.2)	40.8 (4.9)	29.5 (−1.4)	55.2 (12.9)
Daily mean °F (°C)	15.8 (−9.0)	19.4 (−7.0)	30.3 (−0.9)	41.2 (5.1)	51.8 (11.0)	61.4 (16.3)	68.6 (20.3)	67.4 (19.7)	57.4 (14.1)	42.7 (5.9)	29.2 (−1.6)	19.0 (−7.2)	42.0 (5.6)
Mean daily minimum °F (°C)	5.0 (−15.0)	8.4 (−13.1)	17.9 (−7.8)	27.6 (−2.4)	38.2 (3.4)	47.5 (8.6)	53.1 (11.7)	50.7 (10.4)	42.0 (5.6)	29.7 (−1.3)	17.6 (−8.0)	8.5 (−13.1)	28.9 (−1.7)
Mean minimum °F (°C)	−23.2 (−30.7)	−15.1 (−26.2)	−5.2 (−20.7)	9.6 (−12.4)	22.8 (−5.1)	35.1 (1.7)	42.1 (5.6)	38.1 (3.4)	26.1 (−3.3)	11.0 (−11.7)	−4.7 (−20.4)	−18.0 (−27.8)	−28.8 (−33.8)
Record low °F (°C)	−55 (−48)	−44 (−42)	−32 (−36)	−12 (−24)	12 (−11)	20 (−7)	31 (−1)	26 (−3)	7 (−14)	−16 (−27)	−27 (−33)	−42 (−41)	−55 (−48)
Average precipitation inches (mm)	0.26 (6.6)	0.38 (9.7)	0.55 (14)	1.50 (38)	2.72 (69)	2.80 (71)	2.29 (58)	1.77 (45)	1.78 (45)	1.22 (31)	0.47 (12)	0.32 (8.1)	16.06 (407.4)
Average snowfall inches (cm)	6.4 (16)	7.9 (20)	4.0 (10)	4.7 (12)	1.3 (3.3)	0.0 (0.0)	0.0 (0.0)	0.0 (0.0)	0.1 (0.25)	2.3 (5.8)	4.4 (11)	6.9 (18)	38.0 (97)
Average precipitation days (≥ 0.01 in)	3.9	4.9	5.0	7.2	9.1	10.1	7.2	5.2	5.5	5.9	4.3	4.5	72.8
Average snowy days (≥ 0.1 in)	3.3	4.1	2.5	1.7	0.6	0.0	0.0	0.0	0.0	0.9	2.9	3.8	19.8
Source 1: NOAA
Source 2: National Weather Service

== Demographics ==
Historical population
Census	Pop.	Note	%±
1910	487		—
1920	611		25.5%
1930	619		1.3%
1940	625		1.0%
1950	739		18.2%
1960	766		3.7%
1970	644		−15.9%
1980	782		21.4%
1990	628		−19.7%
2000	567		−9.7%
2010	589		3.9%
2020	462		−21.6%
U.S. Decennial Census

=== 2010 census ===
As of the census of 2010, there were 589 people, 278 households, and 153 families residing in the town. The population density was 545.4 inhabitants per square mile (210.6/km^{2}). There were 308 housing units at an average density of 285.2 units per square mile (110.1 units/km^{2}). The racial makeup of the town was 96.4% White, 0.5% Native American, 0.7% Asian, 0.5% from other races, and 1.9% from two or more races. Hispanic or Latino of any race were 1.7% of the population.

There were 278 households, of which 23.4% had children under the age of 18 living with them, 41.4% were married couples living together, 7.2% had a female householder with no husband present, 6.5% had a male householder with no wife present, and 45.0% were non-families. 42.4% of all households were made up of individuals, and 17.3% had someone living alone who was 65 years of age or older. The average household size was 2.03 and the average family size was 2.76.

The median age in the town was 50.4 years. 19.5% of residents were under the age of 18; 4.3% were between the ages of 18 and 24; 19.3% were from 25 to 44; 31.7% were from 45 to 64; and 25.1% were 65 years of age or older. The gender makeup of the town was 47.4% male and 52.6% female.

=== 2000 census ===
As of the census of 2000, there were 567 people, 239 households, and 139 families residing in the town. The population density was 532.3 inhabitants per square mile (205.5/km^{2}). There were 321 housing units at an average density of 301.4 units per square mile (116.4 units/km^{2}). The racial makeup of the town was 98.06% White, 0.35% African American, 0.53% Native American, 0.18% from other races, and 0.88% from two or more races. Hispanic or Latino of any race were 0.71% of the population.

There were 239 households, out of which 25.1% had children under the age of 18 living with them, 46.9% were married couples living together, 8.8% had a female householder with no husband present, and 41.8% were non-families. 39.3% of all households were made up of individuals, and 21.3% had someone living alone who was 65 years of age or older. The average household size was 2.22 and the average family size was 3.00.

In the town, the population was spread out, with 23.1% under the age of 18, 5.8% from 18 to 24, 21.2% from 25 to 44, 23.1% from 45 to 64, and 26.8% who were 65 years of age or older. The median age was 45 years. For every 100 females there were 80.6 males. For every 100 females age 18 and over, there were 78.0 males.

The median income for a household in the town was $26,518, and the median income for a family was $36,250. Males had a median income of $25,893 versus $20,250 for females. The per capita income for the town was $18,105. About 2.9% of families and 10.2% of the population were below the poverty line, including 1.7% of those under age 18 and 14.6% of those age 65 or over.

== Economy ==
The main industry in Wibaux is agriculture. The schools, Wibaux County Extension Office, and county government are major employers.

Beaver Creek Brewery is a craft beer brewery in town. They distribute in Montana and North Dakota.

== Arts and culture ==
The Wibaux Museum contains antiques from early settlers, including Pierre Wibaux and his wife Mary Ellen. The original house owned by the couple is part of the museum complex. It, and 3 other locations in town, are included on the National Register of Historic Places. Other sites in the complex are a Montana Centennial Train Car which was an exhibit in the 1964 World's Fair, a livery stable, and a barber shop.

The other locations on the National Register of Historic Places are: the Wibaux Commercial Historic District, which has a self-guided walking tour, St. Peter's Catholic Church, and the Vogt–Nunberg Farm.

Wibaux Public Library serves the area.

At the western end of town, there is a statue of Pierre Wibaux that he commissioned in his will to look over the sloping landscape.

Each year the town holds a summer festival, called the Ski Fest as homage to its predominantly Polish roots. Festivities include a parade, polka music, and a ranch rodeo.

== Government ==
Wibaux has a mayor and town council. Mayor Jana M. Parker won re-election in November 2025.

== Education ==
Wibaux Schools educates students from kindergarten through 12th grade. Wibaux County High School's team name is the Longhorns.

== Media ==
The local newspaper is the Wibaux Pioneer-Gazette. It is published weekly.

The 2002 Vin Diesel movie, Knockaround Guys, was based (although not filmed) in Wibaux.

== Infrastructure ==
Wibaux is the easternmost town in Montana along Interstate 94. Montana Highway 7 extends south to Ekalaka. Highway 261 travels north to Sidney.

The nearest airport with regional flights is in Glendive, Montana about 30 miles (48 km) away.
