= Montana Highway 7 =

Highway in Montana

Montana Highway 7
- MT 7 highlighted in red

Route information
- Maintained by MDT
- Length: 80.585 mi (129.689 km)
- Existed: May 6, 1930–present

Major junctions
- South end: S-323 in Ekalaka
- US 12 in Baker
- North end: I-94 in Wibaux

Location
- Country: United States
- State: Montana
- Counties: Carter, Fallon, Wibaux

Highway system
- Montana Highway System; Interstate; US; State; Secondary
← MT 5	→ US 12

Montana Highway 7 (MT 7) is an 80.585-mile-long (129.689 km) state highway located in the eastern Montana extending south to north from Ekalaka to Wibaux.

== Route description ==
Montana Highway 7 begins its southern end at the northern terminus of Montana Secondary Highway 323 in the small town of Ekalaka, county seat of Carter County. From there Highway 7 travels north-northwest and passes along the east side of Medicine Rocks State Park at around 11 miles. At 12.089 miles, Highway 7 leaves Carter County and enters Fallon County before intersecting the southern end of Montana Secondary Highway 322 at 13.5 miles. Past S-322, the eastern terminus of Montana Secondary Highway 494 is intersected at 22. 5 miles. The northern terminus of Secondary Highway 322 is intersected at 29.2 miles as MT 7 nears the city of Baker, the Fallon county seat. MT 7 enters Baker from the south named Lake Street and passes along the western edge of Baker Lake. At approximately 35.5 miles MT 7 meets U.S. Highway 12 (Montana Avenue) in the center of Baker. MT 7 heads north from Baker, intersecting the eastern terminus of Secondary Highway 493 (Pennel Road). At approximately 49.6 miles Secondary Highway 336 (Ollie Road) is intersected which heads due east to the North Dakota state line. Shortly after Highway 7 leaves Fallon County and enters Wibaux County at 54.688 miles. At 55.7 miles the southern end of Montana Secondary Highway 413 is intersected before reaching the Lamesteer National Wildlife Refuge. Just past the refuge the northern end of S-413 is intersected at 69.7 miles. Ten miles later the town limits of Wibaux are reached as MT 7 nears its end. MT 7 enters on Wibaux Street and travels north until it reaches 2nd Avenue where MT 7 turns east. Access to Interstate 94 westbound and Montana Secondary Highway 261 can be made via 2nd Avenue west. Highway 7 travels east for a short distance before turning north to meet exit 242 of Interstate 94 where Highway 7 ends at 80.585 miles.

== History ==
Montana State Highway 7 was established May 6, 1930 as a route running from Ekalaka north to Wibaux. In 1937, Highway 7 was extended north along present day Montana Secondary Highway 261 to Sidney. However that was short lived as the route was truncated back to Baker in 1939. By 1946, MT 7 was extended back north to Wibaux its current routing.

== Major intersections ==
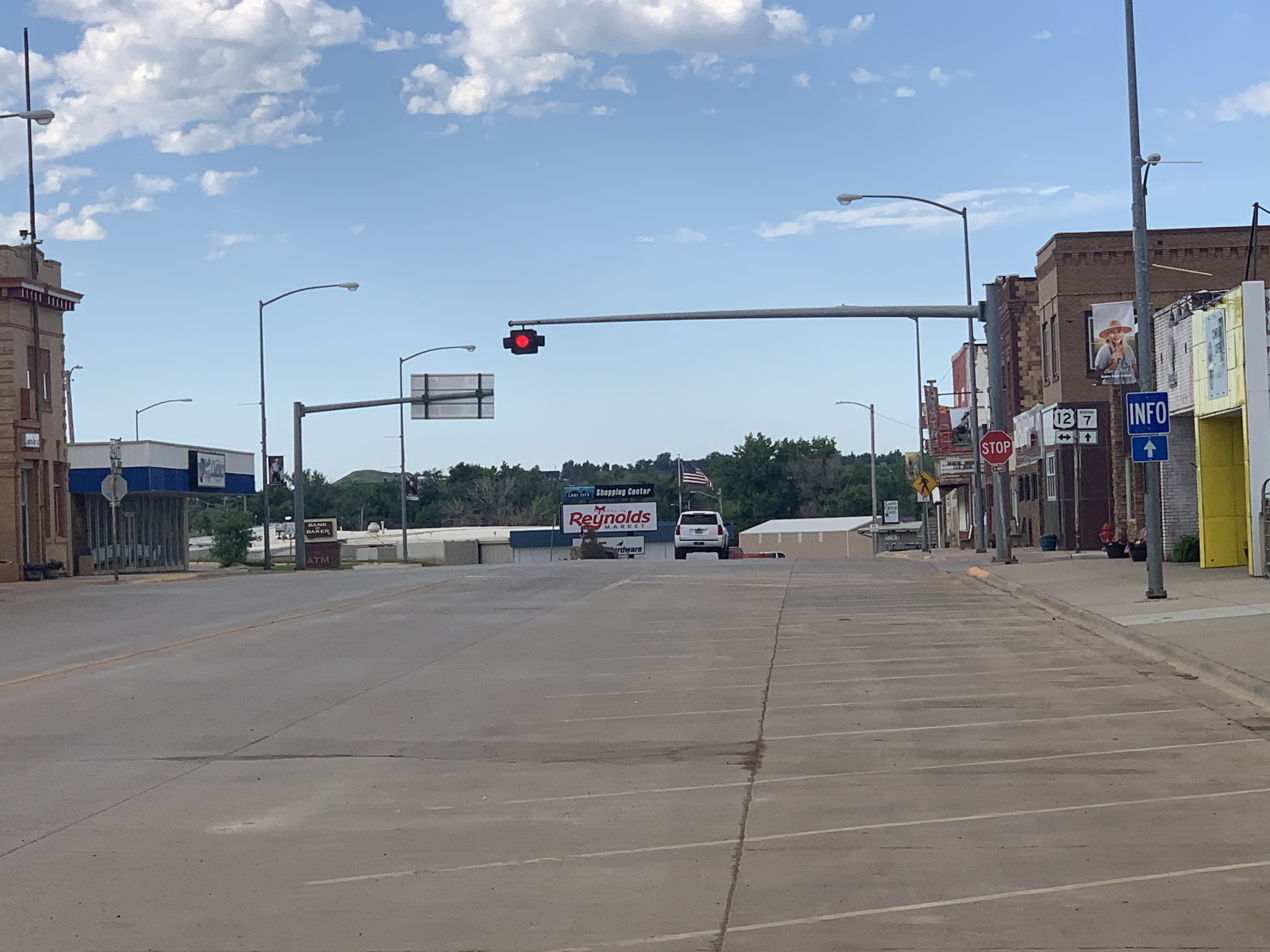
Montana Highway 7 at its junction with U.S. Highway 12 in Baker, Montana

County	Location	mi	km	Destinations	Notes
Carter	Ekalaka	0.000	0.000	S-323	Southern terminus of MT 7; northern terminus of S-323
Fallon		13.558	21.819	S-322	Southern terminus of S-322
Fallon		22.530	36.259	S-494	Eastern terminus of S-494
Fallon		29.152	46.916	S-322	Northern terminus of S-322
Fallon	Baker	35.473	57.088	US 12	
Fallon		36.519	58.772	S-493	Eastern terminus of S-493
Fallon		49.689	79.967	S-336	Western terminus of S-336
Wibaux		55.703	89.645	S-413	Southern terminus of S-413
Wibaux		69.705	112.179	S-413	Northern terminus of S-413
Wibaux	Wibaux	80.067	128.855	To I-94 west To S-261	To exit 241 on I-94; westbound entrance and eastbound exit
Wibaux	Wibaux	80.585	129.689	I-94 east	Exit 242 on I-94; eastbound entrance and westbound exit; northern terminus of MT 7
1.000 mi = 1.609 km; 1.000 km = 0.621 mi: Incomplete access
